This is a list of state leaders in the 21st century (2001–present) AD, such as the heads of state, heads of government, or the general secretaries of single-party states.

These polities are generally sovereign states, including states with limited recognition (when recognised by at least one UN member state), but excludes minor dependent territories, whose leaders can be found listed under territorial governors in the 21st century. For completeness, these lists can include colonies, protectorates, or other dependent territories that have since gained sovereignty.

Africa

Africa: Central

Democratic People's Republic of Angola (complete list) –
Jonas Savimbi, President (1975–1976, 1979–2002)
Paulo Lukamba, Interim leader (2002)

Angola
Presidents (complete list) –
José Eduardo dos Santos, President (1979–2017)
João Lourenço, President (2017–present)
Prime ministers (complete list) –
Fernando da Piedade Dias dos Santos, Prime minister (2002–2008)
Paulo Kassoma, Prime minister (2008–2010)  
post currently abolished

Cameroon
Presidents (complete list) –
Paul Biya, President (1982–present)
Prime ministers (complete list) –
Peter Mafany Musonge, Prime minister (1996–2004)
Ephraïm Inoni, Prime minister (2004–2009)
Philémon Yang, Prime minister (2009–2019)
Joseph Ngute, Prime minister (2019–present)

Central African Republic
Presidents (complete list) –
Ange-Félix Patassé, President (1993–2003)
François Bozizé, President (2003–2013)
Michel Djotodia, President (2013), Transitional Head of State (2013–2014)
Alexandre-Ferdinand Nguendet, Acting Transitional Head of State (2014)
Catherine Samba-Panza, Transitional Head of State (2014–2016)
Faustin-Archange Touadéra, President (2016–present)
Prime ministers (complete list) –
Anicet-Georges Dologuélé, Prime minister (1999–2001)
Martin Ziguélé, Prime minister (2001–2003)
Abel Goumba, Prime minister (2003)
Célestin Gaombalet, Prime minister (2003–2005)
Élie Doté, Prime minister (2005–2008)
Faustin-Archange Touadéra, Prime minister (2008–2013)
Nicolas Tiangaye, Prime minister (2013–2014)
André Nzapayeké, Interim Prime minister (2014)
Mahamat Kamoun, Interim Prime minister (2014–2016)
Simplice Sarandji, Prime minister (2016–2019)
Firmin Ngrébada, Prime minister (2019–2021)
Henri-Marie Dondra, Prime minister (2021–2022)
Félix Moloua, Prime minister (2022–present)

Chad
Heads of state (complete list) –
Idriss Déby, President (1990–2021)
Mahamat Déby, Chairman of the Transitional Military Council (2021–present)
Prime ministers (complete list) –
Nagoum Yamassoum, Prime minister (1999–2002)
Haroun Kabadi, Prime minister (2002–2003)
Moussa Faki, Prime minister (2003–2005)
Pascal Yoadimnadji, Prime minister (2005–2007)
Adoum Younousmi, Acting Prime minister (2007)
Delwa Kassiré Koumakoye, Prime minister (2007–2008)
Youssouf Saleh Abbas, Prime minister (2008–2010)
Emmanuel Nadingar, Prime minister (2010–2013)
Djimrangar Dadnadji, Prime minister (2013)
Kalzeubet Pahimi Deubet, Prime minister (2013–2016)
Albert Pahimi Padacké, Prime minister (2016–2018, 2021–2022)
Saleh Kebzabo, Prime minister (2022–present)

Democratic Republic of the Congo
Presidents (complete list) –
Laurent-Désiré Kabila, President (1997–2001)
Joseph Kabila, President (2001–2019)
Félix Tshisekedi, President (2019–present)
Prime ministers (complete list) –
Antoine Gizenga, Prime minister (2006–2008)
Adolphe Muzito, Prime minister (2008–2012)
Louis Alphonse Koyagialo, Acting Prime minister (2012)
Augustin Matata Ponyo, Prime minister (2012–2016)
Samy Badibanga, Prime minister (2016–2017)
Bruno Tshibala, Prime minister (2017–2019)
Sylvestre Ilunga, Prime minister (2019–2021)
Jean-Michel Sama Lukonde, Prime minister (2021–present)

Republic of the Congo (Brazzaville) 
Presidents (complete list) –
Denis Sassou Nguesso, President (1997–present)
Prime ministers (complete list) –
Isidore Mvouba, Prime minister (2005–2009)
Clément Mouamba, Prime minister (2016–2021)
Anatole Collinet Makosso, Prime minister (2021–present)

Equatorial Guinea
Presidents (complete list) –
Teodoro Obiang Nguema Mbasogo, President (1979–present)
Prime ministers (complete list) –
Ángel Serafín Seriche Dougan, Prime minister (1996–2001)
Cándido Muatetema Rivas, Prime minister (2001–2004)
Miguel Abia Biteo Boricó, Prime minister (2004–2006)
Ricardo Mangue Obama Nfubea, Prime minister (2006–2008)
Ignacio Milam Tang, Prime minister (2008–2012)
Vicente Ehate Tomi, Prime minister (2012–2016)
Francisco Pascual Obama Asue, Prime minister (2016–2023)
Manuela Roka Botey, Prime minister (2023–present)

Gabon
Presidents (complete list) –
Omar Bongo, President (1967–2009)
Didjob Divungi Di Ndinge, Acting President (2009)
Rose Francine Rogombé, Acting President (2009)
Ali Bongo Ondimba, President (2009–present)
Prime ministers (complete list) –
Jean-François Ntoutoume Emane, Prime minister (1999–2006)
Jean Eyeghé Ndong, Prime minister (2006–2009)
Paul Biyoghé Mba, Prime minister (2009–2012)
Raymond Ndong Sima, Prime minister (2012–2014)
Daniel Ona Ondo, Prime minister (2014–2016)
Emmanuel Issoze-Ngondet, Prime minister (2016–2019)
Julien Nkoghe Bekale, Prime minister (2019–2020)
Rose Christiane Raponda, Prime minister (2020–2023)
Alain Claude Billie By Nze, Prime minister (2023–present)

São Tomé and Príncipe
Presidents (complete list) –
Miguel Trovoada, President (1991–2001)
Fradique de Menezes, President (2001–2003)
Fernando Pereira, Acting President (2003) 
Fradique de Menezes, President (2003–2011)
Manuel Pinto da Costa, President (2011–2016)
Evaristo Carvalho, President (2016–2021)
Carlos Vila Nova, President (2021–present)
Prime ministers (complete list) –
Guilherme Posser da Costa, Prime minister (1999–2001)
Evaristo Carvalho, Prime minister (2001–2002)
Gabriel Costa, Prime minister (2002)
Maria das Neves, Prime minister (2002–2004)
Damião Vaz d'Almeida, Prime minister (2004–2005)
Maria do Carmo Silveira, Prime minister (2005–2006)
Tomé Vera Cruz, Prime minister (2006–2008)
Patrice Trovoada, Prime minister (2008)
Joaquim Rafael Branco, Prime minister (2008–2010)
Patrice Trovoada, Prime minister (2010–2012)
Gabriel Costa, Prime minister (2012–2014)
Patrice Trovoada, Prime minister (2014–2018)
Jorge Bom Jesus, Prime minister (2018–2022)
Patrice Trovoada, Prime minister (2022–present)

Africa: East

Burundi
Presidents (complete list) –
Pierre Buyoya, President (1996–2003)
Domitien Ndayizeye, President (2003–2005)
Pierre Nkurunziza, President (2005–2020)
Évariste Ndayishimiye, President (2020–present)
Prime ministers (complete list) –
Alain-Guillaume Bunyoni, Prime minister (2020–2022)
Gervais Ndirakobuca, Prime minister (2022–present)

Comoros
Presidents (complete list) –
Azali Assoumani, President (1999–2001)
Hamada Madi, Acting President (2001)
Azali Assoumani, President (2001–2006)
Ahmed Abdallah Mohamed Sambi, President (2006–2011)
Ikililou Dhoinine, President (2011–2016)
Azali Assoumani, President (2016–present)
Prime ministers (complete list) –
Bianrifi Tarmidi, Prime Minister (1999–2000)
Hamada Madi, Prime minister (2000–2002)
post currently abolished

Djibouti
Presidents (complete list) –
Ismaïl Omar Guelleh, President (1999–present)
Prime ministers (complete list) –
Barkat Gourad Hamadou, Prime minister (1978–2001)
Dileita Mohamed Dileita, Prime minister (2001–2013)
Abdoulkader Kamil Mohamed, Prime minister (2013–present)

Eritrea (complete list) –
Isaias Afwerki, President (1993–present)

Ethiopia
Presidents (complete list) –
Negasso Gidada, President (1995–2001)
Girma Wolde-Giorgis, President (2001–2013)
Mulatu Teshome, President (2013–2018)
Sahle-Work Zewde, President (2018–present)
Prime ministers (complete list) –
Meles Zenawi, Prime minister (1995–2012)
Hailemariam Desalegn, Prime minister (2012–2018)
Abiy Ahmed, Prime minister (2018–present)

Kenya
Presidents (complete list) –
Daniel arap Moi, President (1978–2002)
Mwai Kibaki, President (2002–2013)
Uhuru Kenyatta, President (2013–2022)
William Ruto, President (2022–present)
Prime ministers (complete list) –
Raila Odinga, Prime minister (2008–2013)
Musalia Mudavadi, Prime Cabinet Secretary (2022–present)

Third Republic of Madagascar
Presidents (complete list) –
Didier Ratsiraka, President (1997–2002)
Marc Ravalomanana, President (2002–2009)
Prime ministers (complete list) –
Tantely Andrianarivo, Prime minister (1998–2002)
Jacques Sylla, Prime minister (2002–2007)
Charles Rabemananjara, Prime minister (2007–2009)
Monja Roindefo, Prime minister (2009)
Eugène Mangalaza, Prime minister (2009)
Cécile Manorohanta, Acting Prime minister (2009)
Albert Camille Vital, Prime minister (2009–2011)

High Transitional Authority, Madagascar (complete list) –
Andry Rajoelina, President (2009–2014)

Republic of Madagascar
Presidents (complete list) –
Hery Rajaonarimampianina, President (2014–2018)
Rivo Rakotovao, Acting president (2018–2019)
Andry Rajoelina, President (2019–present)
Prime ministers (complete list) –
Omer Beriziky, Prime minister (2011–2014)
Roger Kolo, Prime minister (2014–2015)
Jean Ravelonarivo, Prime minister (2015–2016)
Olivier Mahafaly Solonandrasana, Prime minister (2016–2018)
Christian Ntsay, Prime minister (2018–present)

Mauritius
Presidents (complete list) –
Cassam Uteem, President (1992–2002)
Angidi Chettiar, Acting President (2002)
Ariranga Pillay, Acting President (2002)
Karl Offmann, President (2002–2003)
Raouf Bundhun, Acting president (2003)
Anerood Jugnauth, President (2003–2012)
Monique Ohsan Bellepeau, Acting president (2012)
Kailash Purryag, President (2012–2015)
Monique Ohsan Bellepeau, Acting president (2015)
Ameenah Gurib, President (2015–2018)
Barlen Vyapoory, Acting president (2018–2019)
Eddy Balancy, Acting president (2019)
Prithvirajsing Roopun, President (2019–present)
Prime ministers (complete list) –
Navin Ramgoolam, Prime minister (1995–2000)
Anerood Jugnauth, Prime minister (2000–2003)
Paul Bérenger, Prime minister (2003–2005)
Navin Ramgoolam, Prime minister (2005–2014)
Anerood Jugnauth, Prime minister (2014–2017)
Pravind Jugnauth, Prime minister (2017–present)

Rwanda
Presidents (complete list) –
Paul Kagame, President (2000–present)
Prime ministers (complete list) –
Bernard Makuza, Prime minister (2000–2011)
Pierre Habumuremyi, Prime minister (2011–2014)
Anastase Murekezi, Prime minister (2014–2017)
Édouard Ngirente, Prime minister (2017–present)

Seychelles (complete list) –
France-Albert René, President (1977–2004)
James Michel, President (2004–2016)
Danny Faure, President (2016–2020)
Wavel Ramkalawan, President (2020–present)

Transitional National Government of the Republic of Somalia
Presidents (complete list) –
Abdiqasim Salad Hassan, President (2000–2004)
Prime ministers (complete list) –
Ali Khalif Galaydh, Prime minister (2000–2001)
Osman Jama Ali, Acting Prime minister (2001)
Hassan Abshir Farah, Prime minister (2001–2003)
Muhammad Abdi Yusuf, Prime minister (2003–2004)

Transitional Federal Government of the Republic of Somalia
Presidents (complete list) –
Abdullahi Yusuf Ahmed, President (2004–2008)
Adan Mohamed Nuur Madobe, Acting President (2008–2009)
Sharif Sheikh Ahmed, President (2009–2012)
Prime ministers (complete list) –
Ali Mohammed Ghedi, Prime minister (2004–2007)
Salim Aliyow Ibrow, Acting Prime minister (2007)
Nur Hassan Hussein, Prime minister (2007–2009)
Omar Abdirashid Ali Sharmarke, Prime minister (2009–2010)
Abdiwahid Elmi Gonjeh, Acting Prime minister (2010)
Mohamed Abdullahi Mohamed, Prime minister (2010–2011)
Abdiweli Mohamed Ali, Prime minister (2011–2012)

Federal Republic of Somalia
Presidents (complete list) –
Muse Hassan Sheikh Sayid Abdulle, Acting President (2012)
Mohamed Osman Jawari, Acting President (2012)
Hassan Sheikh Mohamud, President (2012–2017)
Mohamed Abdullahi Mohamed, President (2017–2022)
Hassan Sheikh Mohamud, President (2022−present)
Prime ministers (complete list) –
Abdiweli Mohamed Ali, Acting Prime minister (2012)
Abdi Farah Shirdon, Prime minister (2012–2013)
Abdiweli Sheikh Ahmed, Prime minister (2013–2014)
Omar Abdirashid Ali Sharmarke, Prime minister (2014–2017)
Hassan Ali Khaire, Prime minister (2017–2020)
Mahdi Mohammed Gulaid, Acting Prime minister (2020)
Mohamed Hussein Roble, Prime minister (2020–2022)
Hamza Abdi Barre, Prime minister (2022−present)

Republic of Somaliland (complete list) –
Muhammad Haji Ibrahim Egal, President (1993–2002)
Dahir Riyale Kahin, President (2002–2010)
Ahmed Mohamed Mohamoud, President (2010–2017)
Muse Bihi Abdi, President (2017–present)

South Sudan
Presidents (complete list) –
Salva Kiir Mayardit, President (2011–present)

Tanzania
Presidents (complete list) –
Benjamin Mkapa, President (1995–2005)
Jakaya Kikwete, President (2005–2015)
John Magufuli, President (2015–2021)
Samia Suluhu Hassan, President (2021–present)
Prime ministers (complete list) –
Frederick Sumaye, Prime minister (1995–2005)
Edward Lowassa, Prime minister (2005–2008)
Mizengo Pinda, Prime minister (2008–2015)
Kassim Majaliwa, Prime minister (2015–present)

Uganda
Presidents (complete list) –
Yoweri Museveni, President (1986–present)
Prime ministers (complete list) –
Apolo Nsibambi, Prime minister (1999–2011)
Amama Mbabazi, Prime minister (2011–2014)
Ruhakana Rugunda, Prime minister (2014–2021)
Robinah Nabbanja, Prime minister (2021–present)

Africa: Northcentral

Libyan Arab Jamahiriya
Heads of state (complete list) –
Muammar Gaddafi, 
Chairman of the Revolutionary Command Council (1969–1977)
Brotherly Leader and Guide of the Revolution (1977–2011)
Prime ministers (complete list) –
Muhammad Ahmad al-Mangoush, Prime minister (1997–2000)
Imbarek Shamekh, Prime minister (2000–2003)
Shukri Ghanem, Prime minister (2003–2006)
Baghdadi Mahmudi, Prime minister (2006–2011)

National Transitional Council of Libya
Head of state (complete list) –
Mustafa Abdul Jalil, Chairman of the National Transitional Council (2011–2012)
Prime ministers (complete list) –
Mahmoud Jibril, Acting Prime minister (2011)
Ali Tarhouni, Acting Prime minister (2011)
Abdurrahim El-Keib, Acting Prime minister (2011–2012)

State of Libya
Heads of state (complete list) –
Mohammed Ali Salim, Acting President (2012)
Mohammed Magariaf, President (2012–2013)
Giuma Ahmed Atigha, Acting President (2013)
Nouri Abusahmain
President of the General National Congress of Libya (2013–2014)
Contesting Chairman of the 2014 General National Congress of Libya (2014–2016)
Abu Bakr Baira, Acting President of the House of Representatives (2014)
Aguila Saleh Issa, contesting President of the House of Representatives (2014–present)
Presidential Council (2016–present)
Fayez al-Sarraj, Chairman (2016–2021)
Mohamed al-Menfi, Chairman (2021–present)
Prime ministers (complete list) –
Abdurrahim El-Keib, Acting Prime minister (2012)
Ali Zeidan, Prime minister (2012–2014)
Abdullah al-Thani, Prime minister in rebellion (2014–present)
Fayez al-Sarraj, Prime minister (2016–2021)
Abdul Hamid Dbeibeh, Prime minister (2021–present)

Tunisia
Presidents (complete list) –
Zine El Abidine Ben Ali, President (1987–2011)
Fouad Mebazaa, Acting President (2011)
Moncef Marzouki, President (2011–2014)
Beji Caid Essebsi, President (2014–2019)
Mohamed Ennaceur, Acting president (2019)
Kais Saied, President (2019–present)
Prime ministers (complete list) –
Mohamed Ghannouchi, Prime minister (1999–2011)
Beji Caid Essebsi, Prime minister (2011)
Hamadi Jebali, Head of government (2011–2013)
Ali Laarayedh, Head of government (2013–2014)
Mehdi Jomaa, Head of government (2014–2015)
Habib Essid, Head of government (2015–2016)
Youssef Chahed, Head of government (2016–2020)
Elyes Fakhfakh, Head of government (2020)
Hichem Mechichi, Head of government (2020–2021)
Najla Bouden, Head of government (2021–present)

Africa: Northeast

Egypt
Presidents (complete list) –
Hosni Mubarak, President (1981–2011)
Mohamed Hussein Tantawi, Interim Head of state (2011–2012)
Mohamed Morsi, President (2012–2013)
Adly Mansour, Interim President (2013–2014)
Abdel Fattah el-Sisi, President (2014–present)
Prime ministers (complete list) –
Atef Ebeid, Prime minister (1999–2004)
Ahmed Nazif, Prime minister (2004–2011)
Ahmed Shafik, Prime minister (2011)
Essam Sharaf, Prime minister (2011)
Kamal Ganzouri, Prime minister (2011–2012)
Hesham Qandil, Prime minister (2012–2013)
Hazem Al Beblawi, Acting Prime minister (2013–2014)
Ibrahim Mahlab, Prime minister (2014–2015)
Sherif Ismail, Prime minister (2015–2018)
Moustafa Madbouly, Prime minister (2018–present)

Sudan
Presidents (complete list)
Omar al-Bashir, President (1989–2019)
Ahmed Awad Ibn Auf, Chairman of the Transitional Military Council (2019)
Abdel Fattah al-Burhan, Chairman of the Transitional Military Council (2019)
Sovereignty Council of Sudan (2019–2021)
Abdel Fattah al-Burhan, Chairman of the Transitional Sovereignty Council (2021–present)
Prime Minister (complete list)
Bakri Hassan Saleh, Prime Minister (2017–2018)
Motazz Moussa, Prime Minister (2018–2019)
Mohamed Tahir Ayala, Prime Minister (2019)
Abdalla Hamdok, Prime Minister (2019–2021)
Abdalla Hamdok, Prime Minister (2021–2022)
Osman Hussein, Prime Minister (2022–present)

Africa: Northwest

Algeria
Presidents (complete list) –
Abdelaziz Bouteflika, President (1999–2019)
Abdelkader Bensalah, Acting President (2019)
Abdelmadjid Tebboune, President (2019–present)
Prime Ministers (complete list) –
Ali Benflis, Prime Minister (2000–2003)
Ahmed Ouyahia, Prime Minister (2003–2006)
Abdelaziz Belkhadem, Prime Minister (2006–2008)
Ahmed Ouyahia, Prime Minister (2008–2012)
Abdelmalek Sellal, Prime Minister (2012–2014)
Youcef Yousfi, Acting Prime Minister (2014)
Abdelmalek Sellal, Prime Minister (2014–2017)
Abdelmadjid Tebboune, Prime Minister (2017)
Ahmed Ouyahia, Prime Minister (2017–2019)
Noureddine Bedoui, Prime Minister (2019)
Sabri Boukadoum, Acting Prime Minister (2019)
Abdelaziz Djerad, Prime Minister (2019–2021)
Aymen Benabderrahmane, Prime Minister (2021–present)

Morocco
Alaouite dynasty (complete list) –
Mohammed VI, King (1999–present)
Prime Ministers (complete list) –
Abderrahmane Youssoufi, Prime Minister (1998–2002)
Driss Jettou, Prime Minister (2002–2007)
Abbas El Fassi, Prime Minister (2007–2011)
Abdelilah Benkirane, Prime Minister (2011–2017)
Saadeddine Othmani, Prime Minister (2017–2021)
Aziz Akhannouch, Prime Minister (2021–present)

Sahrawi Arab Democratic Republic, has limited recognition: Morocco claims Western Sahara
Presidents (complete list) –
Mohamed Abdelaziz, President (1976–2016)
Khatri Addouh, Acting President (2016)
Brahim Ghali, President (2016–present)
Prime Ministers (complete list) –
Bouchraya Hammoudi Bayoun, Prime Minister (1999–2003)
Abdelkader Taleb Omar, Prime Minister (2003–2018)
Mohamed Wali Akeik, Prime Minister (2018–present)

Africa: South

Botswana (complete list) –
Festus Mogae, President (1998–2008)
Ian Khama, President (2008–2018)
Mokgweetsi Masisi, President (2018–present)

Lesotho
Monarchs (complete list) –
Letsie III, King (1990–1995, 1996–present)
Prime ministers (complete list) –
Pakalitha Mosisili, Prime minister (1998–2012)
Tom Thabane, Prime minister (2012–2015)
Pakalitha Mosisili, Prime minister (2015–2017)
Tom Thabane, Prime minister (2017–2020)
Moeketsi Majoro, Prime minister (2020–2022)
Sam Matekane, Prime minister (2022–present)

Malawi (complete list) –
Bakili Muluzi, President (1994–2004)
Bingu wa Mutharika, President (2004–2012)
Joyce Banda, President (2012–2014)
Peter Mutharika, President (2014–2020)
Lazarus Chakwera, President (2020–present)

Mozambique
Presidents (complete list) –
Joaquim Chissano, President (1990–2005)
Armando Guebuza, President (2005–2015)
Filipe Nyusi, President (2015–present)
Prime ministers (complete list) –
Pascoal Mocumbi, Prime minister (1994–2004)
Luísa Diogo, Prime minister (2004–2010)
Aires Ali, Prime minister (2010–2012)
Alberto Vaquina, Prime minister (2012–2015)
Carlos Agostinho do Rosário, Prime minister (2015–2022)
Adriano Maleiane, Prime minister (2022–present)

Namibia
Presidents (complete list) –
Sam Nujoma, President (1990–2005)
Hifikepunye Pohamba, President (2005–2015)
Hage Geingob, President (2015–present)
Prime ministers (complete list) –
Hage Geingob, Prime minister (1990–2002)
Theo-Ben Gurirab, Prime minister (2002–2005)
Nahas Angula, Prime minister (2005–2012)
Hage Geingob, Prime minister (2012–2015)
Saara Kuugongelwa, Prime minister (2015–present)

South Africa (complete list) –
Thabo Mbeki, President (1999–2008)
Ivy Matsepe-Casaburri, Acting President (2008)
Kgalema Motlanthe, President (2008–2009)
Jacob Zuma, President (2009–2018)
Cyril Ramaphosa, President (2018–present)

Eswatini/ Swaziland
Kings (complete list) –
Mswati III, King (1986–present)
tiNdlovukati (complete list) –
Ntfombi, Queen Regent (1983–1986), Ndlovukati (1983–present)
Prime ministers (complete list) –
Barnabas Sibusiso Dlamini, Prime minister (1996–2003)
Paul Shabangu, Acting prime minister (2003)
Themba Dlamini, Prime minister (2003–2008)
Bheki Dlamini, Acting prime minister (2008)
Barnabas Sibusiso Dlamini, Prime minister (2008–2018)
Vincent Mhlanga, Acting prime minister (2018)
Ambrose Mandvulo Dlamini, Prime minister (2018–2020)
Themba N. Masuku, Acting prime minister (2020–2021)
Cleopas Dlamini, Prime minister (2021–present)

Zambia (complete list) –
Frederick Chiluba, President (1991–2002)
Levy Mwanawasa, President (2002–2008)
Rupiah Banda, President (2008–2011)
Michael Sata, President (2011–2014)
Guy Scott, Interim President (2014–2015)
Edgar Lungu, President (2015–2021)
Hakainde Hichilema, President (2021–present)

Zimbabwe
Presidents (complete list) –
Robert Mugabe, President (1987–2017)
Emmerson Mnangagwa, President (2017–present)
Prime ministers (complete list) –
Morgan Tsvangirai, Prime minister (2009–2013)
post currently abolished

Africa: West

Benin
Presidents (complete list) –
Mathieu Kérékou, President (1996–2006)
Thomas Boni Yayi, President (2006–2016)
Patrice Talon, President (2016–present)
Prime ministers (complete list) –
Pascal Koupaki, Prime minister (2011–2013)
Lionel Zinsou, Prime minister (2015–2016)
post currently abolished

Burkina Faso
Heads of State (complete list) –
Paul-Henri Sandaogo Damiba, President of the Patriotic Movement for Safeguard and Restoration (2022)
Ibrahim Traoré, President of the Patriotic Movement for Safeguard and Restoration (2022–present)
Presidents (complete list) –
Blaise Compaoré, President (1987–2014)
Yacouba Isaac Zida, Transitional President (2014)
Michel Kafando, Transitional President (2014–2015)
Gilbert Diendéré, Chairman of the National Council for Democracy (2015)
Chérif Sy, Acting President (2015)
Michel Kafando, Transitional President (2015)
Roch Marc Christian Kaboré, President (2015–2022)
Paul-Henri Sandaogo Damiba, Interim President (2022)
Ibrahim Traoré, Interim President (2022–present)
Prime ministers (complete list) –
Kadré Désiré Ouedraogo, Prime minister (1996–2000)
Paramanga Ernest Yonli, Prime minister (2000–2007)
Tertius Zongo, Prime minister (2007–2011)
Luc-Adolphe Tiao, Prime minister (2011–2014)
Yacouba Isaac Zida, Prime minister (2014–2015)
Paul Kaba Thieba, Prime minister (2016–2019)
Christophe Joseph Marie Dabiré, Prime minister (2019–2021)
Lassina Zerbo, Prime minister (2021–2022)
Albert Ouédraogo, Prime minister (2022)
Appolinaire Joachim Kyelem de Tambela, Prime minister (2022–present)

Cape Verde
Presidents (complete list) –
António Mascarenhas Monteiro, President (1991–2001)
Pedro Pires, President (2001–2011)
Jorge Carlos Fonseca, President (2011–2021)
José Maria Neves, President (2021–present)
Prime ministers (complete list) –
Gualberto do Rosário, Prime minister (2000–2001)
José Maria Neves, Prime minister (2001–2016)
Ulisses Correia e Silva, Prime minister (2016–present)

The Gambia (complete list) –
Yahya Jammeh, Chairman of the Armed Forces Provisional Ruling Council (1994–1996), President (1996–2017)
Adama Barrow, President (2017–present)

Ghana (complete list) –
Jerry Rawlings, Military head of state (1981–1993), President (1993–2001)
John Kufuor, President (2001–2009)
John Atta Mills, President (2009–2012)
John Dramani Mahama, President (2012–2017)
Nana Akufo-Addo, President (2017–present)

Guinea
Presidents (complete list) –
Lansana Conté, President (1984–2008)
Moussa Dadis Camara, President (2008–2009)
Sékouba Konaté, Acting President (2009–2010)
Alpha Condé, President (2010–2021)
Mamady Doumbouya, Interim President (2021–present)
Prime ministers (complete list) –
Lamine Sidimé, Prime minister (1999–2004)
François Lonseny Fall, Prime minister (2004)
Cellou Dalein Diallo, Prime minister (2004–2006)
Eugène Camara, Prime minister (2007)
Lansana Kouyaté, Prime minister (2007–2008)
Ahmed Tidiane Souaré, Prime minister (2008)
Kabiné Komara, Prime minister (2008–2010)
Jean-Marie Doré, Prime minister (2010)
Mohamed Said Fofana, Prime minister (2010–2015)
Mamady Youla, Prime minister (2015–2018)
Ibrahima Kassory Fofana, Prime minister (2018–2021)
Mohamed Béavogui, Interim Prime minister (2021–2022)
Bernard Goumou, Interim Prime minister (2022–present)

Guinea-Bissau
Presidents (complete list) –
Kumba Ialá, President (2000–2003)
Veríssimo Correia Seabra, Chairman of the Military Committee (2003)
Henrique Rosa, Acting President (2003–2005)
João Bernardo Vieira, President (2005–2009)
Raimundo Pereira, Acting President (2009)
Malam Bacai Sanhá, President (2009–2012)
Raimundo Pereira, Acting President (2012)
Mamadu Ture Kuruma, Chairman of the Military Command (2012)
Manuel Serifo Nhamadjo, Acting President (2012–2014)
José Mário Vaz, President (2014–2020)
Umaro Sissoco Embaló, President (2020–present)
Prime ministers (complete list) –
Caetano N'Tchama, Prime minister (2000–2001)
Faustino Imbali, Prime minister (2001)
Alamara Nhassé, Prime minister (2001–2002)
Mário Pires, Prime minister (2002–2003)
Artur Sanhá, Prime minister (2003–2004)
Carlos Gomes Júnior, Prime minister (2004–2005)
Aristides Gomes, Prime minister (2005–2007)
Martinho Ndafa Kabi, Prime minister (2007–2008)
Carlos Correia, Prime minister (2008–2009)
Carlos Gomes Júnior, Prime minister (2009–2012)
Adiato Djaló Nandigna, Acting Prime minister (2012)
Rui Duarte de Barros, Acting Prime minister (2012–2014)
Domingos Simões Pereira, Prime minister (2014–2015)
Baciro Djá, Prime minister (2015)
Carlos Correia, Prime minister (2015–2016)
Baciro Djá, Prime minister (2016)
Umaro Sissoco Embaló, Prime minister (2016–2018)
Artur Silva, Prime minister (2018)
Aristides Gomes, Prime minister (2018–2020)
Nuno Gomes Nabiam, Prime minister (2020–present)

Ivory Coast
Presidents (complete list) –
Laurent Gbagbo, President (2000–2011)
Alassane Ouattara, President (2010–present)
Prime ministers (complete list) –
Pascal Affi N'Guessan, Prime minister (2000–2003)
Seydou Diarra, Prime minister (2003–2005)
Charles Konan Banny, Prime minister (2005–2007)
Guillaume Soro, Prime minister (2007–2012)
Gilbert Aké, disputed prime minister (2010–2011)
Jeannot Ahoussou-Kouadio, Prime minister (2012)
Daniel Kablan Duncan, Prime minister (2012–2017)
Amadou Gon Coulibaly, Prime minister (2017–2020)
Hamed Bakayoko, Prime minister (2020–2021)
Patrick Achi, Prime minister (2021–present)

Liberia (complete list) –
Charles Taylor, President (1997–2003)
Moses Blah, President (2003)
Gyude Bryant, Chairman of the National Transitional Government (2003–2006)
Ellen Johnson Sirleaf, President (2006–2018)
George Weah, President (2018–present)

Mali
Presidents (complete list) –
Alpha Oumar Konaré, President (1992–2002)
Amadou Toumani Touré, President (2002–2012)
Amadou Sanogo, Chairperson of the National Committee (2012)
Dioncounda Traoré, Acting President (2012–2013)
Ibrahim Boubacar Keïta, President (2013–2020)
Assimi Goïta, Head of State (2020)
Bah Ndaw, Acting President (2020–2021)
Assimi Goïta, Acting President (2021–present)
Prime ministers (complete list) –
Mandé Sidibé, Prime minister (2000–2002)
Modibo Keita, Prime minister (2002)
Ahmed Mohamed ag Hamani, Prime minister (2002–2004)
Ousmane Issoufi Maïga, Prime minister (2004–2007)
Modibo Sidibé, Prime minister (2007–2011)
Cissé Mariam Kaïdama Sidibé, Prime minister (2011–2012)
Cheick Modibo Diarra, Acting Prime minister (2012)
Django Sissoko, Acting Prime minister (2012–2013)
Oumar Tatam Ly, Prime minister (2013–2014)
Moussa Mara, Prime minister (2014–2015)
Modibo Keita, Prime minister (2015–2017)
Abdoulaye Idrissa Maïga, Prime minister (2017)
Soumeylou Boubèye Maïga, Prime minister (2017–2019)
Boubou Cisse, Prime Minister (2019–2020)
Moctar Ouane, Acting Prime Minister (2020–2021)
Choguel Kokalla Maïga, Acting Prime Minister (2021–2022)
Abdoulaye Maïga, Acting Prime minister (2022–present)

Mauritania
Presidents (complete list) –
Maaouya Ould Sid'Ahmed Taya, President (1984–2005)
Ely Ould Mohamed Vall, Chairman of the Military Council (2005–2007)
Sidi Ould Cheikh Abdallahi, President (2007–2008)
Mohamed Ould Abdel Aziz, Acting President (2008–2009)
Ba Mamadou Mbaré, Acting President (2009)
Mohamed Ould Abdel Aziz, President (2009–2019)
Mohamed Ould Ghazouani, President (2019–present)
Prime ministers (complete list) –
Cheikh El Avia Ould Mohamed Khouna, Prime minister (1998–2003)
Sghair Ould M'Bareck, Prime minister (2003–2005)
Sidi Mohamed Ould Boubacar, Prime minister (2005–2007)
Zeine Ould Zeidane, Prime minister (2007–2008)
Yahya Ould Ahmed El Waghef, Prime minister (2008)
Moulaye Ould Mohamed Laghdaf, Prime minister (2008–2014)
Yahya Ould Hademine, Prime minister (2014–2018)
Mohamed Salem Ould Béchir, Prime minister (2018–2019)
Ismail Ould Bedde Ould Cheikh Sidiya, Prime minister (2019–2020)
Mohamed Ould Bilal, Prime minister (2020–present)

Niger
Presidents (complete list) –
Mamadou Tandja, President (1999–2010)
Salou Djibo, Supreme Council for the Restoration of Democracy (2010–2011)
Mahamadou Issoufou, President (2011–2021)
Mohamed Bazoum, President (2021–present)
Prime ministers (complete list) –
Hama Amadou, Prime minister (2000–2007)
Seyni Oumarou, Prime minister (2007–2009)
Albadé Abouba, Acting Prime minister (2009)
Ali Badjo Gamatié, Prime minister (2009–2010)
Mahamadou Danda, Prime minister (2010–2011)
Brigi Rafini, Prime minister (2011–2021)
Ouhoumoudou Mahamadou, Prime minister (2021–present)

Nigeria: Fourth Nigerian Republic (complete list) –
Olusegun Obasanjo, President (1999–2007)
Umaru Musa Yar'Adua, President (2007–2010)
Goodluck Jonathan, President (2010–2015)
Muhammadu Buhari, President (2015–present)

Senegal
Presidents (complete list) –
Abdoulaye Wade, President (2000–2012)
Macky Sall, President (2012–present)
Prime ministers (complete list) –
Moustapha Niasse, Prime minister (2000–2001)
Mame Madior Boye, Prime minister (2001–2002)
Idrissa Seck, Prime minister (2002–2004)
Macky Sall, Prime minister (2004–2007)
Cheikh Hadjibou Soumaré, Prime minister (2007–2009)
Souleymane Ndéné Ndiaye, Prime minister (2009–2012)
Abdoul Mbaye, Prime minister (2012–2013)
Aminata Touré, Prime minister (2013–2014)
Mahammed Dionne, Prime minister (2014–2019)
post currently abolished

Sierra Leone
Presidents (complete list) –
Ahmad Tejan Kabbah, President (1998–2007)
Ernest Bai Koroma, President (2007–2018)
Julius Maada Bio, President (2018–present)
Chief ministers (complete list) –
David J. Francis, Chief minister (2018–2021)
Jacob Jusu Saffa, Chief minister (2021–present)

Togo
Presidents (complete list) –
Gnassingbé Eyadéma, President (1967–2005)
Faure Gnassingbé, President (2005)
Bonfoh Abass, Interim President (2005)
Faure Gnassingbé, President (2005–present)
Prime ministers (complete list) –
Agbéyomé Kodjo, Prime minister (2000–2002)
Koffi Sama, Prime minister (2002–2005)
Edem Kodjo, Prime minister (2005–2006)
Yawovi Agboyibo, Prime minister (2006–2007)
Komlan Mally, Prime minister (2007–2008)
Gilbert Houngbo, Prime minister (2008–2012)
Kwesi Ahoomey-Zunu, Prime minister (2012–2015)
Komi Sélom Klassou, Prime minister (2015–2020)
Victoire Tomegah Dogbé, Prime minister (2020–present)

Americas

Americas: Caribbean

Antigua and Barbuda
Monarchs (complete list) –
Elizabeth II, Queen (1981–2022)
Charles III, King (2022–present)
Prime ministers (complete list) –
Lester Bird, Prime minister (1994–2004)
Baldwin Spencer, Prime minister (2004–2014)
Gaston Browne, Prime minister (2014–present)

Aruba (complete list) –
Constituent country 2010–present
For details see the Netherlands under western Europe

The Bahamas
Monarchs (complete list) –
Elizabeth II, Queen (1973–2022)
Charles III, King (2022–present)
Prime ministers (complete list) –
Hubert Ingraham, Prime minister (1992–2002)
Perry Christie, Prime minister (2002–2007)
Hubert Ingraham, Prime minister (2007–2012)
Perry Christie, Prime minister (2012–2017)
Hubert Minnis, Prime minister (2017–2021)
Philip Davis, Prime minister (2021–present)

Barbados
Monarchs (complete list) –
Elizabeth II, Queen (1966–2021)
Presidents (complete list) –
Sandra Mason, President (2021–present) 
Prime ministers (complete list) –
Owen Arthur, Prime minister (1994–2008)
David Thompson, Prime minister (2008–2010)
Freundel Stuart, Prime minister (2010–2018)
Mia Mottley, Prime minister (2018–present)

Cuba
First Secretaries of the Communist Party of Cuba
Fidel Castro, First secretary (1965–2011)
Raúl Castro, First secretary (2011–2021)
Miguel Díaz-Canel, First secretary (2021–present)
Presidents (complete list) –
Fidel Castro, President of the State Council (1976–2008)
Raúl Castro, President of the State Council (2008–2018)
Miguel Díaz-Canel, President (2018–present)
Heads of government (complete list) –
Fidel Castro, Prime minister (1959–1976), President of the Council of Ministers (1976–2008)
Raúl Castro, President of the Council of Ministers (2008–2018)
Miguel Díaz-Canel, acting Prime minister (2018–2019)
Manuel Marrero Cruz, Prime minister (2019–present)

Curaçao (complete list) –
Constituent country 2010–present
For details see the Netherlands under western Europe

Dominica
Presidents (complete list) –
Vernon Shaw, President (1998–2003)
Nicholas Liverpool, President (2003–2012)
Eliud Williams, President (2012–2013)
Charles Savarin, President (2013–present)
Prime ministers (complete list) –
Pierre Charles, Prime minister (2000–2004)
Osborne Riviere, Acting President (2004)
Roosevelt Skerrit, Prime minister (2004–present)

Dominican Republic (complete list) –
Hipólito Mejía, President (2000–2004)
Leonel Fernández, President (2004–2012)
Danilo Medina, President (2012–2020)
Luis Abinader, President (2020–present)

Grenada
Monarchs (complete list) –
Elizabeth II, Queen (1974–2022)
Charles III, King (2022–present)
Prime ministers (complete list) –
Keith Mitchell, Prime minister (1995–2008)
Tillman Thomas, Prime minister (2008–2013)
Keith Mitchell, Prime minister (2013–2022)
Dickon Mitchell, Prime minister (2022–present)

Haiti
Heads of state (complete list) –
René Préval, President (1996–2001)
Jean-Bertrand Aristide, President (2001–2004)
Boniface Alexandre, Provisional President (2004–2006)
René Préval, President (2006–2011)
Michel Martelly, President (2011–2016)
Council of Ministers (2016)
Jocelerme Privert, Provisional President (2016–2017)
Jovenel Moïse, President (2017–2021)
Vacant (2021–present)
Prime ministers (complete list) –
Jacques-Édouard Alexis, Prime minister (1999–2001)
Jean Marie Chérestal, Prime minister (2001–2002)
Yvon Neptune, Prime minister (2002–2004)
Gérard Latortue, Prime minister (2004–2006)
Jacques-Édouard Alexis, Prime minister (2006–2008)
Michèle Pierre-Louis, Prime minister (2008–2009)
Jean-Max Bellerive, Prime minister (2009–2011)
Garry Conille, Prime minister (2011–2012)
Laurent Lamothe, Prime minister (2012–2014)
Florence Duperval Guillaume, Acting Prime minister (2014–2015)
Evans Paul, Prime minister (2015–2016)
Fritz Jean, Prime minister (2016)
Enex Jean-Charles, Prime minister (2016–2017)
Jack Guy Lafontant, Prime minister (2017–2018)
Jean-Henry Céant, Prime minister (2018–2019)
Jean-Michel Lapin, Acting Prime minister (2019–2020)
Joseph Joute, Prime minister (2020–2021)
Claude Joseph, Acting Prime minister (2021)
Ariel Henry, Acting Prime minister (2021–present)

Jamaica
Monarchs (complete list) –
Elizabeth II, Queen (1962–2022)
Charles III, King (2022–present)
Prime ministers (complete list) –
P. J. Patterson, Prime minister (1992–2006)
Portia Simpson-Miller, Prime minister (2006–2007)
Bruce Golding, Prime minister (2007–2011)
Andrew Holness, Prime minister (2011–2012)
Portia Simpson-Miller, Prime minister (2012–2016)
Andrew Holness, Prime minister (2016–present)

Netherlands Antilles (complete list) –
Constituent country 1954–2010
For details see the Netherlands under western Europe

Saint Kitts and Nevis
Monarchs (complete list) –
Elizabeth II, Queen (1983–2022)
Charles III, King (2022–present)
Prime ministers (complete list) –
Denzil Douglas, Prime minister (1995–2015)
Timothy Harris, Prime minister (2015–2022)
Terrance Drew, Prime minister (2022–present)

Saint Lucia
Monarchs (complete list) –
Elizabeth II, Queen (1979–2022)
Charles III, King (2022–present)
Prime ministers (complete list) –
Kenny Anthony, Prime minister (1997–2006)
John Compton, Prime minister (2006–2007)
Stephenson King, Prime minister (2007–2011)
Kenny Anthony, Prime minister (2011–2016)
Allen Chastanet, Prime minister (2016–2021)
Philip Pierre, Prime minister (2021–present)

Sint Maarten (complete list) –
Constituent country 2010–present
For details see the Netherlands under western Europe

Saint Vincent and the Grenadines
Monarchs (complete list) –
Elizabeth II, Queen (1979–2022)
Charles III, King (2022–present)
Prime ministers (complete list) –
Arnhim Eustace, Prime minister (2000–2001)
Ralph Gonsalves, Prime minister (2001–present)

Trinidad and Tobago
Presidents (complete list) –
A. N. R. Robinson, President (1997–2003)
George Maxwell Richards, President (2003–2013)
Anthony Carmona, President (2013–2018)
Paula-Mae Weekes, President (2018–present)
Prime ministers (complete list) –
Basdeo Panday, Prime minister (1995–2001)
Patrick Manning, Prime minister (2001–2010)
Kamla Persad-Bissessar, Prime minister (2010–2015)
Keith Rowley, Prime minister (2015–present)

Americas: Central

Belize
Monarchs (complete list) –
Elizabeth II, Queen (1981–2022)
Charles III, King (2022–present)
Prime ministers (complete list) –
Said Musa, Prime minister (1998–2008)
Dean Barrow, Prime minister (2008–2020)
Johnny Briceño, Prime minister (2020–present)

Costa Rica (complete list) –
Miguel Rodríguez Echeverría, President (1998–2002)
Abel Pacheco de la Espriella, President (2002–2006)
Óscar Arias, President (2006–2010)
Laura Chinchilla, President (2010–2014)
Luis Guillermo Solís, President (2014–2018)
Carlos Alvarado Quesada, President (2018–2022)
Rodrigo Chaves Robles, President (2022–present)

El Salvador (complete list) –
Francisco Flores Pérez, President (1999–2004)
Antonio Saca, President (2004–2009)
Mauricio Funes, President (2009–2014)
Salvador Sánchez Cerén, President (2014–2019)
Nayib Bukele, President (2019–present)

Guatemala (complete list) –
Alfonso Portillo, President (2000–2004)
Óscar Berger, President (2004–2008)
Álvaro Colom, President (2008–2012)
Otto Pérez Molina, President (2012–2015)
Alejandro Maldonado, Acting President (2015–2016)
Jimmy Morales, President (2016–2020)
Alejandro Giammattei, President (2020–present)

Honduras (complete list) –
Carlos Roberto Flores, President (1998–2002)
Ricardo Maduro, President (2002–2006)
Manuel Zelaya, President (2006–2009)
Roberto Micheletti, Acting President (2009–2010)
Porfirio Lobo Sosa, President (2010–2014)
Juan Orlando Hernández, President (2014–2022)
Xiomara Castro, President (2022–present)

Nicaragua (complete list) –
Arnoldo Alemán, President (1997–2002)
Enrique Bolaños, President (2002–2007)
Daniel Ortega, President (2007–present)

Panama (complete list) –
Mireya Moscoso, President (1999–2004)
Martín Torrijos, President (2004–2009)
Ricardo Martinelli, President (2009–2014)
Juan Carlos Varela, President (2014–2019)
Laurentino Cortizo, President (2019–present)

Americas: North

Canada
Monarchs (complete list) –
Elizabeth II, Queen (1952–2022)
Charles III, King (2022–present)
Prime ministers (complete list) –
Jean Chrétien, Prime minister (1993–2003)
Paul Martin, Prime minister (2003–2006)
Stephen Harper, Prime minister (2006–2015)
Justin Trudeau, Prime minister (2015–present)

Mexico (complete list) –
Vicente Fox, President (2000–2006)
Felipe Calderón, President (2006–2012)
Enrique Peña Nieto, President (2012–2018)
Andrés Manuel López Obrador, President (2018–present)

United States (complete list) –
Bill Clinton, President (1993–2001)
George W. Bush, President (2001–2009)
Barack Obama, President (2009–2017)
Donald Trump, President (2017–2021)
Joe Biden, President (2021–present)

Americas: South

Argentina (complete list) –
Fernando de la Rúa, President (1999–2001)
Adolfo Rodríguez Saá, President (2001)
Eduardo Duhalde, President (2002–2003)
Néstor Kirchner, President (2003–2007)
Cristina Fernández de Kirchner, President (2007–2015)
Mauricio Macri, President (2015–2019)
Alberto Fernandez, President (2019–present)

Bolivia (complete list) –
Hugo Banzer, President (1997–2001)
Jorge Quiroga, President (2001–2002)
Gonzalo Sánchez de Lozada, President (2002–2003)
Carlos Mesa, President (2003–2005)
Eduardo Rodríguez, President (2005–2006)
Evo Morales, President (2006–2019)
Jeanine Áñez, President (2019–2020)
Luis Arce, President (2020–present)

Brazil (complete list) –
Fernando Henrique Cardoso, President (1995–2002)
Luiz Inácio Lula da Silva, President (2003–2010)
Dilma Rousseff, President (2011–2016)
Michel Temer, President (2016–2018)
Jair Bolsonaro, President (2019–2022)
Luiz Inácio Lula da Silva, President (2023–present)

Chile (complete list) –
Eduardo Frei Ruiz-Tagle, President (1994–2000)
Ricardo Lagos, President (2000–2006)
Michelle Bachelet, President (2006–2010)
Sebastián Piñera, President (2010–2014)
Michelle Bachelet, President (2014–2018)
Sebastián Piñera, President (2018–2022)
Gabriel Boric, President (2022–present)

Colombia (complete list) –
Andrés Pastrana Arango, President (1998–2002)
Álvaro Uribe Vélez, President (2002–2010)
Juan Manuel Santos Calderón, President (2010–2018)
Iván Duque Márquez, President (2018–2022)
Gustavo Petro, President (2022–present)

Ecuador (complete list) –
Gustavo Noboa, President (2000–2003)
Lucio Gutiérrez, President (2003–2005)
Alfredo Palacio, President (2005–2007)
Rafael Correa, President (2007–2017)
Lenín Moreno, President (2017–2021)
Guillermo Lasso, President (2021–present)

Guyana
Presidents (complete list) –
Bharrat Jagdeo, President (1999–2011)
Donald Ramotar, President (2011–2015)
David A. Granger, President (2015–2020)
Irfaan Ali, President (2020–present)
Prime ministers (complete list) –
Sam Hinds, Prime minister (1999–2015)
Moses Nagamootoo, Prime minister (2015–2020)
Mark Phillips, Prime minister (2020–present)

Paraguay (complete list) –
Luis González, President (1999–2003)
Nicanor Duarte, President (2003–2008)
Fernando Lugo, President (2008–2012)
Federico Franco, President (2012–2013)
Horacio Cartes, President (2013–2018)
Mario Abdo Benítez, President (2018–present)

Peru
Presidents (complete list) –
Valentín Paniagua, President of Transition Government (2000–2001)
Alejandro Toledo, Constitutional President (2001–2006)
Alan García Pérez, Constitutional President (2006–2011)
Ollanta Humala, Constitutional President (2011–2016)
Pedro Pablo Kuczynski, Constitutional President (2016–2018)
Martín Vizcarra, Constitutional President (2018–2020)
Manuel Merino, Constitutional President (2020)
Francisco Sagasti, Constitutional President (2020–2021)
Pedro Castillo, Constitutional President (2021–2022)
Dina Boluarte, Constitutional President (2022–present)
Prime minister (complete list) –
Javier Pérez de Cuéllar, Prime Minister (2000–2001)
Roberto Dañino, Prime Minister (2001–2002)
Luis Solari De La Fuente, Prime Minister (2002–2003)
Beatriz Merino, Prime Minister (2003)
Carlos Ferrero, Prime Minister (2003–2005)
Pedro Pablo Kuczynski, Prime Minister (2005–2006)
Jorge Del Castillo, Prime Minister (2006–2008)
Yehude Simon, Prime Minister (2008–2009)
Javier Velásquez, Prime Minister (2009–2010)
José Antonio Chang, Prime Minister (2010–2011)
Rosario Fernández, Prime Minister (2011)
Salomón Lerner Ghitis, Prime Minister (2011)
Oscar Valdés, Prime Minister (2011–2012)
Juan Jiménez Mayor, Prime Minister (2012–2013)
César Villanueva, Prime Minister (2013–2014)
René Cornejo, Prime Minister (2014)
Ana Jara, Prime Minister (2014–2015)
Pedro Cateriano, Prime Minister (2015–2016)
Fernando Zavala, Prime Minister (2016–2017)
Mercedes Aráoz, Prime Minister (2017–2018)
César Villanueva, Prime minister (2018–2019)
Salvador del Solar, Prime minister (2019)
Vicente Zeballos, Prime minister (2019–2020)
Walter Martos, Prime minister (2020)
Ántero Flores Aráoz, Prime minister (2020)
Violeta Bermúdez, Prime minister (2020–2021)
Guido Bellido, Prime minister (2021)
Mirtha Vásquez, Prime minister (2021–2022)
Héctor Valer, Prime minister (2022)
Aníbal Torres, Prime minister (2022)
Betssy Chávez, Prime minister (2022)
Pedro Angulo Arana, Prime minister (2022)
Alberto Otárola, Prime minister (2022–present)

Suriname (complete list) –
Ronald Venetiaan, President (2000–2010)
Dési Bouterse, President (2010–2021)
Chan Santokhi, President (2021–present)

Uruguay (complete list) –
Julio María Sanguinetti, President (1995–2000)
Jorge Batlle, President (2000–2005)
Tabaré Vázquez, President (2005–2010)
José Mujica, President (2010–2015)
Tabaré Vázquez, President (2015–2020)
Luis Lacalle Pou, President (2020–present)

Bolivarian Republic of Venezuela (complete list) –
Hugo Chávez, President (1999–2002, 2002–2013)
Pedro Carmona, Acting President (2002)
Diosdado Cabello, Acting President (2002)
Nicolás Maduro, President (2013–present; disputed since 2019) 
Juan Guaidó, Acting President (2019–2023; disputed with Nicolás Maduro)
Dinorah Figuera, Acting President (2023–present; disputed with Nicolás Maduro)

Asia

Asia: Central

Kazakhstan
Presidents (complete list) –
Nursultan Nazarbayev, President (1991–2019)
Kassym-Jomart Tokayev, President (2019–present)
Prime ministers (complete list) –
Kassym-Jomart Tokayev, Prime minister (1999–2002)
Imangali Tasmagambetov, Prime minister (2002–2003)
Daniyal Akhmetov, Prime minister (2003–2007)
Karim Massimov, Prime minister (2007–2012)
Serik Akhmetov, Prime minister (2012–2014)
Karim Massimov, Prime minister (2014–2016)
Bakhytzhan Sagintayev, Prime minister (2016–2019)
Askar Mamin, Prime minister (2019–2022)
Alihan Smaiylov, Prime minister (2022–present)

Kyrgyzstan
Presidents (complete list) –
Askar Akayev, President (1990–2005)
Ishenbai Kadyrbekov, Acting President (2005)
Kurmanbek Bakiyev, President (2005–2010)
Roza Otunbayeva, President (2010–2011)
Almazbek Atambayev, President (2011–2017)
Sooronbay Jeenbekov, President (2017–2020)
Sadyr Japarov, Acting President (2020)
Talant Mamytov, Acting President (2020–2021)
Sadyr Japarov, President (2021–present)
Prime ministers (complete list) –
Kurmanbek Bakiyev, Prime minister (2000–2002)
Nikolai Tanayev, Prime minister (2002–2005)
Kurmanbek Bakiyev, Prime minister (2005)
Medetbek Kerimkulov, Acting Prime minister (2005)
Felix Kulov, Acting Prime minister (2005–2007)
Azim Isabekov, Prime minister (2007)
Almazbek Atambayev, Prime minister (2007)
Iskenderbek Aidaraliyev, Acting Prime minister (2007)
Igor Chudinov, Prime minister (2007–2009)
Daniar Usenov, Prime minister (2009–2010)
Almazbek Atambayev, Prime minister (2010–2011)
Ömürbek Babanov, Acting Prime minister (2011)
Almazbek Atambayev, Prime minister (2011)
Ömürbek Babanov, Prime minister (2011–2012)
Aaly Karashev, Acting Prime minister (2012)
Zhantoro Satybaldiyev, Prime minister (2012–2014)
Djoomart Otorbaev, Prime minister (2014–2015)
Temir Sariyev, Prime minister (2015–2016)
Sooronbay Jeenbekov, Prime minister (2016–2017)
Sapar Isakov, Prime minister (2017–2018)
Mukhammedkalyi Abylgaziev, Prime minister (2018–2020)
Kubatbek Boronov, Prime minister (2020)
Sadyr Japarov, Prime minister (2020)
Artem Novikov, Acting Prime minister (2020–2021)
Ulukbek Maripov, Chairman of the Cabinet of Ministers (2021)
Akylbek Japarov, Chairman of the Cabinet of Ministers (2021–present)

Tajikistan
Presidents (complete list) –
Emomali Rahmon, Chairman of the Supreme Assembly (1992–1994), President (1994–present)
Prime ministers (complete list) –
Oqil Oqilov, Prime minister (1999–2013)
Kokhir Rasulzoda, Prime minister (2013–present)

Turkmenistan (complete list) –
Saparmurat Niyazov, President (1990–2006)
Gurbanguly Berdimuhamedow, Acting President (2006–2007), President (2007–2022)
Serdar Berdimuhamedow, President (2022–present)
Uzbekistan
Presidents (complete list) –
Islam Karimov, President (1991–2016)
Nigmatilla Yuldashev, Acting President (2016)
Shavkat Mirziyoyev, President (2016–present)
Prime ministers (complete list) –
Oʻtkir Sultonov, Prime minister (1995–2003)
Shavkat Mirziyoyev, Prime minister (2003–2016)
Abdulla Aripov, Prime minister (2016–present)

Asia: East

China
Chairmen and General Secretaries of the Communist Party (complete list) and paramount leaders (complete list) –
Jiang Zemin, General Secretary (1989–2002), paramount leader (1989–2002)
Hu Jintao, General Secretary (2002–2012), paramount leader (2002–2012)
Xi Jinping, General Secretary (2012–present), paramount leader (2012–present)
Heads of state (complete list) –
Jiang Zemin, President (1993–2003)
Hu Jintao, President (2003–2013)
Xi Jinping, President (2013–present)
Premiers (complete list) –
Zhu Rongji, Premier (1998–2003)
Wen Jiabao, Premier (2003–2013)
Li Keqiang, Premier (2013–2023)
Li Qiang, Premier (2023–present)

Japan
Emperors (complete list) –
Akihito, Emperor (1989–2019)
Naruhito, Emperor (2019–present)
Prime ministers (complete list) –
Yoshirō Mori, Prime minister (2000–2001)
Junichirō Koizumi, Prime minister (2001–2006)
Shinzō Abe, Prime minister (2006–2007)
Yasuo Fukuda, Prime minister (2007–2008)
Tarō Asō, Prime minister (2008–2009)
Yukio Hatoyama, Prime minister (2009–2010)
Naoto Kan, Prime minister (2010–2011)
Yoshihiko Noda, Prime minister (2011–2012)
Shinzō Abe, Prime minister (2012–2020)
Yoshihide Suga, Prime minister (2020–2021)
Fumio Kishida, Prime minister (2021–present)

North Korea
Leaders of the Workers' Party (complete list) –
Kim Jong-il, General Secretary (1997–2011), Eternal General Secretary (2012–present)
Kim Jong-un, First Secretary (2012–2016), Chairman (2016–2021), General Secretary (2021–present)
Head of state
Kim Yong-nam (1998–2019)
Choe Ryong-hae (2019–present)
Kim Jong-un, President of State Affairs (2016–present)
Premiers (complete list) –
Hong Song-nam, Premier (1997–2003)
Pak Pong-ju, Premier (2003–2007)
Kim Yong-il, Premier (2007–2010)
Choe Yong-rim, Premier (2010–2013)
Pak Pong-ju, Premier (2013–2019)
Kim Jae-ryong, Premier (2019–2020)
Kim Tok-hun, Premier (2020–present)

South Korea
Presidents (complete list) –
Kim Dae-jung, President (1998–2003)
Roh Moo-hyun, President (2003–2008)
Goh Kun, Acting President (2004)
Lee Myung-bak, President (2008–2013)
Park Geun-hye, President (2013–2017)
Hwang Kyo-ahn, Acting President (2016–2017)
Moon Jae-in, President (2017–2022)
Yoon Suk-yeol, President (2022–present)
Prime ministers (complete list) –
Lee Han-dong, Prime minister (2000–2002)
Chang Sang, Acting Prime minister (2002)
Chang Dae-whan, Acting Prime minister (2002)
Kim Suk-soo, Prime minister (2002–2003)
Goh Kun, Prime minister (2003–2004)
Lee Hae-chan, Prime minister (2004–2006)
Han Myeong-sook, Prime minister (2006–2007)
Han Duck-soo, Prime minister (2007–2008)
Han Seung-soo, Prime minister (2008–2009)
Chung Un-chan, Prime minister (2009–2010)
Yoon Jeung-hyun, Acting Prime minister (2010)
Kim Hwang-sik, Prime minister (2010–2013)
Chung Hong-won, Prime minister (2013–2015)
Lee Wan-koo, Prime minister (2015)
Choi Kyoung-hwan, Acting Prime minister (2015)
Hwang Kyo-ahn, Prime minister (2015–2017)
Yoo Il-ho, Acting Prime minister (2017)
Lee Nak-yeon, Prime minister (2017–2020)
Chung Sye-kyun, Prime minister (2020–2021)
Kim Boo-kyum, Prime minister (2021–2022)
Han Duck-soo, Prime minister (2022–present)

Mongolia
Presidents (complete list) –
Natsagiin Bagabandi, President (1997–2005)
Nambaryn Enkhbayar, President (2005–2009)
Tsakhiagiin Elbegdorj, President (2009–2017)
Khaltmaagiin Battulga, President (2017–2021)
Ukhnaagiin Khürelsükh, President (2021–present)
Prime ministers (complete list) –
Nambaryn Enkhbayar, Prime minister (2000–2004)
Tsakhiagiin Elbegdorj, Prime minister (2004–2006)
Miyeegombyn Enkhbold, Prime minister (2006–2007)
Sanjaagiin Bayar, Prime minister (2007–2009)
Sükhbaataryn Batbold, Prime minister (2009–2012)
Norovyn Altankhuyag, Prime minister (2012–2014)
Dendeviin Terbishdagva, Acting Prime minister (2014)
Chimediin Saikhanbileg, Prime minister (2014–2016)
Jargaltulgyn Erdenebat, Prime minister (2016–2017)
Ukhnaagiin Khürelsükh, Prime minister (2017–2021)
Luvsannamsrain Oyun-Erdene, Prime minister (2021–present)

Taiwan
Presidents (complete list) –
Chen Shui-bian, President (2000–2008)
Ma Ying-jeou, President (2008–2016)
Tsai Ing-wen, President (2016–present)
Premiers (complete list) –
Chang Chun-hsiung, Premier (2000–2002)
Yu Shyi-kun, Premier (2002–2005)
Frank Hsieh, Premier (2005–2006)
Su Tseng-chang, Premier (2006–2007)
Chang Chun-hsiung, Premier (2007–2008)
Liu Chao-shiuan, Premier (2008–2009)
Wu Den-yih, Premier (2009–2012)
Sean Chen, Premier (2012–2013)
Jiang Yi-huah, Premier (2013–2014)
Mao Chi-kuo, Premier (2014–2016)
Chang San-cheng, Premier (2016)
Lin Chuan, Premier (2016–2017)
William Lai, Premier (2017–2019)
Su Tseng-chang, Premier (2019–2023)
Chen Chien-jen, Premier (2023–present)

Asia: Southeast

Brunei (complete list) –
Hassanal Bolkiah, sultan (1967–present)

Cambodia
Kings (complete list) –
Norodom Sihanouk, king (1993–2004)
Norodom Sihamoni, king (2004–present)
Prime ministers (complete list) –
Hun Sen, prime minister (1998–present)

East Timor (independent 2002–present)
Presidents (complete list) –
Xanana Gusmão, president (2002–2007)
José Ramos-Horta, president (2007–2008)
Vicente Guterres, acting president (2008)
Fernando de Araújo, acting president (2008)
José Ramos-Horta, president (2008–2012)
Taur Matan Ruak, president (2012–2017)
Francisco Guterres, president (2017–2022)
José Ramos-Horta, president (2022–present)
Prime ministers (complete list) –
Mari Alkatiri, prime minister (2002–2006)
José Ramos-Horta, prime minister (2006–2007)
Estanislau da Silva, prime minister (2007)
Xanana Gusmão, prime minister (2007–2015)
Rui Maria de Araújo, prime minister (2015–2017)
Mari Alkatiri, prime minister (2017–2018)
Taur Matan Ruak, prime minister (2018–present)

Indonesia (complete list) –
Abdurrahman Wahid, president (1999–2001)
Megawati Sukarnoputri, president (2001–2004)
Susilo Bambang Yudhoyono, president (2004–2014)
Joko Widodo, president (2014–present)

Laos
General Secretaries (complete list) –
Khamtai Siphandone, chairman (1992–2006)
Choummaly Sayasone, general secretary (2006–2016)
Bounnhang Vorachit, general secretary (2016–2021)
Thongloun Sisoulith, general secretary (2021–present)
Presidents (complete list) –
Khamtai Siphandone, president (1998–2006)
Choummaly Sayasone, president (2006–2016)
Bounnhang Vorachit, president (2016–2021)
Thongloun Sisoulith, president (2021–present)
Prime ministers (complete list) –
Sisavath Keobounphanh, prime minister (1998–2001)
Bounnhang Vorachit, prime minister (2001–2006)
Bouasone Bouphavanh, prime minister (2006–2010)
Thongsing Thammavong, prime minister (2010–2016)
Thongloun Sisoulith, prime minister (2016–2021)
Phankham Viphavanh, prime minister (2021–2022)
Sonexay Siphandone, prime minister (2022–present)

Malaysia
Elected monarchs (complete list) –
Salahuddin of Selangor, Yang di-Pertuan Agong (1999–2001)
Sirajuddin of Perlis, Yang di-Pertuan Agong (2001–2006)
Mizan Zainal Abidin of Terengganu, Yang di-Pertuan Agong (2006–2011)
Abdul Halim of Kedah, Yang di-Pertuan Agong (2011–2016)
Muhammad V of Kelantan, Yang di-Pertuan Agong (2016–2019)
Abdullah of Pahang, Yang di-Pertuan Agong (2019–present)
Prime ministers (complete list) –
Mahathir Mohamad, prime minister (1981–2003)
Abdullah Ahmad Badawi, prime minister (2003–2009)
Najib Razak, prime minister (2009–2018)
Mahathir Mohamad, prime minister (2018–2020)
Muhyiddin Yassin, prime minister (2020–2021)
Ismail Sabri Yaakob, prime minister (2021–2022)
Anwar Ibrahim, prime minister (2022–present)

Republic of South Maluku (unrecognized)
(complete list) –
Frans Tutuhatunewa, president (1993–2010)
John Wattilete, president (2010–present)

Myanmar
Union of Myanmar (1997–2011)
Heads of state (complete list) –
Than Shwe, chairman (1992–2011)
Prime ministers (complete list) –
Than Shwe, prime minister (1992–2003)
Khin Nyunt, prime minister (2003–2004)
Soe Win, prime minister (2004–2007)
Thein Sein, prime minister (2007–2011)
Republic of the Union of Myanmar (2011–present)
Presidents (complete list) –
Thein Sein, president (2011–2016)
Htin Kyaw, president (2016–2018)
Myint Swe, acting president (2018)
Win Myint, president (2018–2021)
Myint Swe, acting president (2021–present)
State counsellors (complete list) –
Position created 2016
Aung San Suu Kyi, state counsellor (2016–2021)
Vacant since 2021
Prime ministers (complete list) –
Position created 2021
Min Aung Hlaing, prime minister (2021–present)
Chairmen of the State Administration Council
Position created 2021
Min Aung Hlaing, chairman (2021–present)

Philippines: Fifth Republic
Presidents (complete list) –
Joseph Estrada, president (1998–2001)
Gloria Macapagal Arroyo, president (2001–2010)
Benigno Aquino III, president (2010–2016)
Rodrigo Duterte, president (2016–2022)
Bongbong Marcos, president (2022−present)

Singapore
Presidents (complete list) –
S. R. Nathan, president (1999–2011)
Tony Tan, president (2011–2017)
Halimah Yacob, president (2017–present)
Prime ministers (complete list) –
Goh Chok Tong, prime minister (1990–2004)
Lee Hsien Loong, prime minister (2004–present)

Thailand
Monarchs (complete list) –
Bhumibol Adulyadej, king (1946–2016)
Vajiralongkorn, king (2016–present)
Prime ministers (complete list) –
Chuan Leekpai, prime minister (1997–2001)
Thaksin Shinawatra, prime minister (2001–2006)
Chitchai Wannasathit, acting prime minister (2006)
Thaksin Shinawatra, prime minister (2006)
Sonthi Boonyaratglin, President of the Administrative Reform Council of Thailand (2006)
Surayud Chulanont, prime minister (2006–2008)
Samak Sundaravej, prime minister (2008)
Somchai Wongsawat, prime minister (2008)
Chaovarat Chanweerakul, acting crime minister (2008)
Abhisit Vejjajiva, prime minister (2008–2011)
Yingluck Shinawatra, prime minister (2011–2014)
Niwatthamrong Boonsongpaisan, acting prime minister (2014)
Prayut Chan-o-cha, prime minister (2014–2022)
Prawit Wongsuwon, acting prime minister (2022)
Prayut Chan-o-cha, prime minister (2022–present)

Vietnam
General Secretaries of the Communist Party (complete list) –
Lê Khả Phiêu, general secretary (1997–2001)
Nông Đức Mạnh, general secretary (2001–2011)
Nguyễn Phú Trọng, general secretary (2011–present)
Presidents (complete list) –
Trần Đức Lương, president (1997–2006)
Nguyễn Minh Triết, president (2006–2011)
Trương Tấn Sang, president (2011–2016)
Nguyễn Phú Trọng, acting president (2016)
Trần Đại Quang, president (2016–2018)
Đặng Thị Ngọc Thịnh, acting president (2018)
Nguyễn Phú Trọng, president (2018–2021)
Nguyễn Xuân Phúc, president (2021–2023)
Võ Thị Ánh Xuân, acting president (2023)
Võ Văn Thưởng, president (2023–present)
Prime ministers (complete list) –
Phan Văn Khải, prime minister (1997–2006)
Nguyễn Tấn Dũng, prime minister (2006–2016)
Nguyễn Xuân Phúc, prime minister (2016–2021)
Phạm Minh Chính, prime minister (2021–present)

Asia: South

Islamic State of Afghanistan
Presidents (complete list) –
Burhanuddin Rabbani, President (1992–2001)
Hamid Karzai, Chairman of the Afghan Interim Administration (2001–2002)

Islamic Emirate of Afghanistan
Supreme leaders (complete list) –
Mullah Omar (1996–2001)
Prime ministers –
Mohammad Rabbani (1996–2001)
Abdul Kabir (acting, 2001)

Transitional Islamic State of Afghanistan
Presidents (complete list) –
Hamid Karzai, President (2002–2004)

Islamic Republic of Afghanistan
Presidents (complete list) –
Hamid Karzai, President (2004–2014)
Ashraf Ghani, President (2014–2021)
Chief executive officers
Abdullah Abdullah (2014–2020)

Islamic Emirate of Afghanistan
Supreme leaders (complete list) –
Hibatullah Akhundzada (2021–present)
Prime ministers –
Hasan Akhund (acting, 2021–present)

Bangladesh
Presidents (complete list) –
Shahabuddin Ahmed, President (1996–2001)
A. Q. M. Badruddoza Chowdhury, President (2001–2002)
Muhammad Jamiruddin Sircar, Interim President (2002)
Iajuddin Ahmed, President (2002–2009)
Zillur Rahman, President (2009–2013)
Abdul Hamid, President (2013–present)
Prime ministers (complete list) –
Sheikh Hasina, Prime minister (1996–2001)
Latifur Rahman, Prime minister (2001)
Khaleda Zia, Prime minister (2001–2006)
Iajuddin Ahmed, Prime minister (2006–2007)
Fazlul Haque, Interim Prime minister (2007)
Fakhruddin Ahmed, Interim Prime minister (2007–2009)
Sheikh Hasina, Prime minister (2009–present)

Bhutan
Monarchs (complete list) –
Jigme Singye Wangchuck, Druk Gyalpo (1972–2006)
Jigme Khesar Namgyel Wangchuck, Druk Gyalpo (2006–present)
Prime ministers (complete list) –
Yeshey Zimba, Prime minister (2000–2001)
Khandu Wangchuk, Prime minister (2001–2002)
Kinzang Dorji, Prime minister (2002–2003)
Jigme Thinley, Prime minister (2003–2004)
Yeshey Zimba, Prime minister (2004–2005)
Sangay Ngedup, Prime minister (2005–2006)
Khandu Wangchuk, Prime minister (2006–2007)
Kinzang Dorji, Prime minister (2007–2008)
Jigme Thinley, Prime minister (2008–2013)
Tshering Tobgay, Prime minister (2013–2018)
Lotay Tshering, Prime minister (2018–present)

India
Presidents (complete list) –
K. R. Narayanan, President (1997–2002)
A. P. J. Abdul Kalam, President (2002–2007)
Pratibha Patil, President (2007–2012)
Pranab Mukherjee, President (2012–2017)
Ram Nath Kovind, President (2017–2022)
Droupadi Murmu, President (2022–present)
Prime ministers (complete list) –
Atal Bihari Vajpayee, Prime minister (1998–2004)
Manmohan Singh, Prime minister (2004–2014)
Narendra Modi, Prime minister (2014–present)

Maldives (complete list) –
Maumoon Abdul Gayoom, President (1978–2008)
Mohamed Nasheed, President (2008–2012)
Mohammed Waheed Hassan, President (2012–2013)
Abdulla Yameen, President (2013–2018)
Ibrahim Mohamed Solih, President (2018–present)

Kingdom of Nepal
Kings (complete list) –
Birendra, King (1972–2001)
Dipendra, King (2001)
Gyanendra, King (2001–2008)
Prime ministers (complete list) –
Girija Prasad Koirala, Prime minister (2000–2001)
Sher Bahadur Deuba, Prime minister (2001–2002)
Lokendra Bahadur Chand, Prime minister (2002–2003)
Surya Bahadur Thapa, Prime minister (2003–2004)
Sher Bahadur Deuba, Prime minister (2004–2005)
Girija Prasad Koirala, Prime minister (2006–2008)

Federal Democratic Republic of Nepal
Presidents (complete list) –
Girija Prasad Koirala, Acting President (2007–2008)
Ram Baran Yadav, President (2008–2015)
Bidya Devi Bhandari, President (2015–2023)
Ram Chandra Poudel, President (2023–present)
Prime ministers (complete list) –
Girija Prasad Koirala, Prime minister (2008)
Pushpa Kamal Dahal, Prime minister (2008–2009)
Madhav Kumar Nepal, Prime minister (2009–2011)
Jhala Nath Khanal, Prime minister (2011)
Baburam Bhattarai, Prime minister (2011–2013)
Khil Raj Regmi, Acting Prime minister (2013–2014)
Sushil Koirala, Prime minister (2014–2015)
Khadga Prasad Oli, Prime minister (2015–2016)
Pushpa Kamal Dahal, Prime minister (2016–2017)
Sher Bahadur Deuba, Prime minister (2017–2018)
Khadga Prasad Oli, Prime minister (2018–2021)
Sher Bahadur Deuba, Prime minister (2021–2022)
Pushpa Kamal Dahal, Prime minister (2022–present)

Pakistan
Presidents (complete list) –
Muhammad Rafiq Tarar, President (1997–2001)
Pervez Musharraf, President (2001–2008)
Muhammad Mian Soomro, Acting President (2008)
Asif Ali Zardari, President (2008–2013)
Mamnoon Hussain, President (2013–2018)
Arif Alvi, President (2018–present)
Prime ministers (complete list) –
Zafarullah Khan Jamali, Prime minister (2002–2004)
Chaudhry Shujaat Hussain, Prime minister (2004)
Shaukat Aziz, Prime minister (2004–2007)
Muhammad Mian Soomro, Acting Prime minister (2007–2008)
Yousaf Raza Gillani, Prime minister (2008–2012)
Raja Pervaiz Ashraf, Prime minister (2012–2013)
Mir Hazar Khan Khoso, Acting Prime minister (2013)
Nawaz Sharif, Prime minister (2013–2017)
Shahid Khaqan Abbasi, Prime minister (2017–2018)
Imran Khan, Prime minister (2018–2022)
Shehbaz Sharif, Prime minister (2022–present)

Sri Lanka
Presidents (complete list) –
Chandrika Kumaratunga, President (1994–2005)
Mahinda Rajapaksa, President (2005–2015)
Maithripala Sirisena, President (2015–2019)
Gotabaya Rajapaksa, President (2019–2022)
Ranil Wickremesinghe, President (2022–present)
Prime ministers (complete list) –
Ratnasiri Wickremanayake, Prime minister (2000–2001)
Ranil Wickremesinghe, Prime minister (2001–2004)
Mahinda Rajapaksa, Prime minister (2004–2005)
Ratnasiri Wickremanayake, Prime minister (2005–2010)
D. M. Jayaratne, Prime minister (2010–2015)
Ranil Wickremesinghe, Prime minister (2015–2019)
Mahinda Rajapaksa, Prime minister (2019–2022)
Ranil Wickremesinghe, Prime minister (2022)
Dinesh Gunawardena, Prime minister (2022–present)

Asia: West

State / Kingdom of Bahrain
Monarchs (complete list) –
Hamad bin Isa Al Khalifa, Emir (1999–2002), King (2002–present)
Prime ministers (complete list) –
Khalifa bin Salman Al Khalifa, Prime minister (1971–2020)
Salman bin Hamad Al Khalifa, Prime minister (2020–present)

Cyprus (complete list) –
Glafcos Clerides, President (1993–2003)
Tassos Papadopoulos, President (2003–2008)
Demetris Christofias, President (2008–2013)
Nicos Anastasiades, President (2013–2023)
Nikos Christodoulides, President (2023–present)

Northern Cyprus
Presidents (complete list) –
Rauf Denktaş, President (1983–2005)
Mehmet Ali Talat, President (2005–2010)
Derviş Eroğlu, President (2010–2015)
Mustafa Akıncı, President (2015–2020)
Ersin Tatar, President (2020–present)
Prime ministers (complete list) –
Derviş Eroğlu, Prime minister (1985–1994, 1996–2004, 2009–2010))
Mehmet Ali Talat, Prime minister (2004–2005)
Serdar Denktaş, acting Prime minister (2005)
Ferdi Sabit Soyer, Prime minister (2005–2009)
İrsen Küçük, Prime minister (2010–2013)
Sibel Siber, Prime minister (2013)
Özkan Yorgancıoğlu, Prime minister (2013–2015)
Ömer Kalyoncu, Prime minister (2015–2016)
Hüseyin Özgürgün, acting Prime minister (2010), Prime minister (2016–2018)
Tufan Erhürman, Prime minister (2018–2019)
Ersin Tatar, Prime minister (2019–2020)
Ersan Saner, Prime minister (2020–2021)
Faiz Sucuoğlu, Prime minister (2021–2022)
Ünal Üstel, Prime minister (2022–present)

Iran
Supreme Leaders (complete list) –
Ali Khamenei, Supreme Leader (1989–present)
Presidents (complete list) –
Mohammad Khatami, President (1997–2005)
Mahmoud Ahmadinejad, President (2005–2013)
Hassan Rouhani, President (2013–2021)
Ebrahim Raisi, President (2021–present)

Ba'athist Iraq
Presidents (complete list) –
Saddam Hussein, President (1979–2003)
Prime ministers (complete list) –
Saddam Hussein, Prime minister (1994–2003)
Coalition Provisional Authority, Iraq
Jay Garner, Administrator of the Coalition Provisional Authority (2003)
Paul Bremer, Administrator of the Coalition Provisional Authority (2003–2004)
Prime ministers (complete list) –
Mohammad Bahr al-Ulloum, Acting Prime minister (2003)
Ibrahim al-Jaafari, Prime minister (2003)
Ahmed al-Chalabi, Prime minister (2003)
Ayad Allawi, Prime minister (2003)
Jalal Talabani, Prime minister (2003)
Abdul Aziz al-Hakim, Prime minister (2003)
Adnan al-Pachachi, Prime minister (2004)
Mohsen Abdel Hamid, Prime minister (2004)
Mohammad Bahr al-Ulloum, Prime minister (2004)
Massoud Barzani, Prime minister (2004)
Ezzedine Salim, Prime minister (2004)
Ghazi Mashal Ajil al-Yawer, Prime minister (2004)

Republic of Iraq
Presidents (complete list) –
Ghazi Mashal Ajil al-Yawer, Interim President (2004–2005)
Jalal Talabani, President (2005–2014)
Fuad Masum, President (2014–2018)
Barham Salih, President (2018–2022)
Abdul Latif Rashid, President (2022–present)
Prime ministers (complete list) –
Ayad Allawi, Acting Prime minister (2004–2005)
Ibrahim al-Jaafari, Prime minister (2005–2006)
Nouri al-Maliki, Prime minister (2006–2014)
Haider al-Abadi, Prime minister (2014–2018)
Adil Abdul-Mahdi, Prime minister (2018–2020)
Mustafa Al-Kadhimi, Prime minister (2020–2022)
Mohammed Shia' Al Sudani, Prime minister (2022–present)

Israel
Heads of state (complete list) –
Ezer Weizman, President (1993–2000)
Moshe Katsav, President (2000–2007)
Shimon Peres, President (2007–2014)
Reuven Rivlin, President (2014–2021)
Isaac Herzog, President (2021–present)
Prime ministers (complete list) –
Ehud Barak, Prime minister (1999–2001)
Ariel Sharon, Prime minister (2001–2006)
Ehud Olmert, Prime minister (2006–2009)
Benjamin Netanyahu, Prime minister (2009–2021)
Naftali Bennett, Prime minister (2021–2022)
Yair Lapid, Prime minister (2022)
Benjamin Netanyahu, Prime minister (2022–present)

Jordan
Kings (complete list) –
Abdullah II, King (1999–present)
Prime ministers (complete list) –
Ali Abu al-Ragheb, Prime minister (2000–2003)
Faisal al-Fayez, Prime minister (2003–2005)
Adnan Badran, Prime minister (2005)
Marouf al-Bakhit, Prime minister (2005–2007)
Nader al-Dahabi, Prime minister (2007–2009)
Samir Rifai, Prime minister (2009–2011)
Marouf al-Bakhit, Prime minister (2011)
Awn Shawkat Al-Khasawneh, Prime minister (2011–2012)
Fayez al-Tarawneh, Prime minister (2012)
Abdullah Ensour, Prime minister (2012–2016)
Hani Mulki, Prime minister (2016–2018)
Omar Razzaz, Prime minister (2018–2020)
Bisher Al-Khasawneh, Prime minister (2020–present)

Kuwait
Monarchs (complete list) –
Jaber III, Emir (1977–2006)
Saad I, Emir (2006)
Sabah IV, Emir (2006–2020)
Nawaf I, Emir (2020–present)
Prime ministers (complete list) –
Saad Al-Abdullah, Prime minister (1978–2003)
Sabah Al-Ahmad, Prime minister (2003–2006)
Nasser Al-Mohammed, Prime minister (2006–2011)
Jaber Al-Mubarak, Prime minister (2011–2019)
Sabah Al-Khalid, Prime minister (2019–2022)
Ahmad Nawaf, Prime minister (2022–present)

Lebanon
Presidents (complete list) –
Émile Lahoud, President (1998–2007)
Fouad Siniora, Acting President (2007–2008)
Michel Suleiman, President (2008–2014)
Tammam Salam, Acting President (2014–2016)
Michel Aoun, President (2016–2022)
Najib Mikati, Acting President (2022-present)
Prime ministers (complete list) –
Rafic Hariri, Prime minister (2000–2004)
Omar Karami, Prime minister (2004–2005)
Najib Mikati, Prime minister (2005)
Fouad Siniora, Prime minister (2005–2009)
Saad Hariri, Prime minister (2009–2011)
Najib Mikati, Prime minister (2011–2014)
Tammam Salam, Prime minister (2014–2016)
Saad Hariri, Prime minister (2016–2020)
Hassan Diab, Prime minister (2020), caretaker Prime minister (2020–2021)
Najib Mikati, Prime minister (2021–present)

Oman (complete list) –
Qaboos bin Said, Sultan (1970–2020)
Haitham bin Tariq, Sultan (2020–present)

Palestinian National Authority (complete list) –
Yasser Arafat, President (1994–2004)
Rawhi Fattouh, interim President (2004–2005)
Mahmoud Abbas, President (2005–present)

State of Palestine
Presidents (complete list) –
Yasser Arafat, President (1994–2004)
Mahmoud Abbas, Acting President (2005–2008), President (2008–present)
Prime ministers (complete list) –
Mahmoud Abbas, Prime minister (2003)
Ahmed Qurei, Prime minister (2003–2005)
Nabil Shaath, Acting Prime minister (2005)
Ahmed Qurei, Prime minister (2005–2006)
Ismail Haniyeh, Prime minister (2006–2014)
Salam Fayyad, Prime minister (2007–2013)
Rami Hamdallah, Prime minister (2013–2019)
Mohammad Shtayyeh, Prime minister (2019–present)

Qatar
Emirs (complete list) –
Hamad bin Khalifa Al Thani, Emir (1995–2013)
Tamim bin Hamad Al Thani, Emir (2013–present)
Prime ministers (complete list) –
Abdullah bin Khalifa, Prime minister (1996–2007)
Hamad bin Jassim, Prime minister (2007–2013)
Abdullah bin Nasser, Prime minister (2013–2020)
Khalid bin Khalifa, Prime minister (2020–2023)
Mohammed bin Abdulrahman, Prime minister (2023–present)

Saudi Arabia (complete list) –
Fahd, King (1982–2005)
Abdullah, King (2005–2015)
Salman, King (2015–present)

Syria
Presidents (complete list) –
Bashar al-Assad, President (2000–present)
Prime ministers (complete list) –
Muhammad Mustafa Mero, Prime minister (2000–2003)
Muhammad Naji al-Otari, Prime minister (2003–2011)
Adel Safar, Prime minister (2011–2012)
Riyad Farid Hijab, Prime minister (2012)
Omar Ibrahim Ghalawanji, Acting Prime minister (2012)
Wael Nader al-Halqi, Prime minister (2012–2016)
Imad Khamis, Prime minister (2016–2020)
Hussein Arnous, Prime minister (2020–present)

Turkey
Presidents (complete list) –
Ahmet Necdet Sezer, President (2000–2007)
Abdullah Gül, President (2007–2014)
Recep Tayyip Erdoğan, President (2014–present)
Prime ministers (complete list) –
Bülent Ecevit, Prime minister (1999–2002)
Abdullah Gül, Prime minister (2002–2003)
Recep Tayyip Erdoğan, Prime minister (2003–2014)
Ahmet Davutoğlu, Prime minister (2014–2016)
Binali Yıldırım, Prime minister (2016–2018)
Prime minister office abolished in 2018.

United Arab Emirates
Presidents (complete list) –
Zayed bin Sultan Al Nahyan, President (1971–2004)
Khalifa bin Zayed Al Nahyan, President (2004–2022)
Mohamed bin Zayed Al Nahyan, President (2022–present)
Prime ministers (complete list) –
Maktoum bin Rashid Al Maktoum, Prime minister (1990–2006)
Mohammed bin Rashid Al Maktoum, Prime minister (2006–present)

Yemen
Presidents (complete list) –
Ali Abdullah Saleh, Chairman of the Presidential Council (1990–1994), President (1994–2012)
Abdrabbuh Mansur Hadi, Acting President (2011–2012), President (2012–2022)
Rashad al-Alimi, Chairman of the Presidential Leadership Council (2022–present)
Prime ministers (complete list) –
Abd Al-Karim Al-Iryani, Prime minister (1998–2001)
Abdul Qadir Bajamal, Prime minister (2001–2007)
Ali Muhammad Mujawar, Prime minister (2007–2011)
Mohammed Basindawa, Prime minister (2011–2014)
Abdullah Mohsen al-Akwa, Acting Prime minister (2014)
Khaled Bahah, Prime minister (2014–2016)
Ahmed Obeid bin Daghr, Prime minister (2016–2018)
Maeen Abdulmalik Saeed, Prime minister (2018–present)
Abdel-Aziz bin Habtour, Disputed Prime minister (2016–present)

Houthi takeover in Yemen
Presidents (complete list) –
Mohammed Ali al-Houthi, President of the Supreme Revolutionary Committee (2015–2016)
Saleh Ali al-Sammad, President of the Supreme Political Council (2016–present)
Prime ministers (complete list) –
Talal Aklan, Acting Prime minister (2016–present)

Europe

Europe: Balkans

Albania
Chairmen (complete list) –
Rexhep Meidani, President (1997–2002)
Alfred Moisiu, President (2002–2007)
Bamir Topi, President (2007–2012)
Bujar Nishani, President (2012–2017)
Ilir Meta, President (2017–2022)
Bajram Begaj, President (2022–present)
Prime ministers (complete list) –
Ilir Meta, Prime minister (1999–2002)
Pandeli Majko, Prime minister (2002)
Fatos Nano, Prime minister (2002–2005)
Sali Berisha, Prime minister (2005–2013)
Edi Rama, Prime minister (2013–present)

Bosnia and Herzegovina
High Representatives (complete list) –
Wolfgang Petritsch, High Representative (1999–2002)
Paddy Ashdown, High Representative (2002–2006)
Christian Schwarz-Schilling, High Representative (2006–2007)
Miroslav Lajčák, High Representative (2007–2009)
Valentin Inzko, High Representative (2009–2021)
Christian Schmidt, High Representative (2021–present)

Presidency (complete list) –
Chairmen of the Presidency (complete list) –
Živko Radišić, Chairman (2000–2001)
Jozo Križanović, Chairman (2001–2002)
Beriz Belkić, Chairman (2002)
Mirko Šarović, Chairman (2002–2003)
Dragan Čović, Chairman (2003)
Borislav Paravac, Chairmen (2003)
Dragan Čović, Chairman (2003–2004)
Sulejman Tihić, Chairman (2004)
Borislav Paravac, Chairman (2004–2005)
Ivo Miro Jović, Chairman (2005–2006)
Sulejman Tihić, Chairman (2006)
Nebojša Radmanović, Chairman (2006–2007)
Željko Komšić, Chairman (2007–2008)
Haris Silajdžić, Chairman (2008)
Nebojša Radmanović, Chairman (2008–2009)
Željko Komšić, Chairman (2009–2010)
Haris Silajdžić, Chairman (2010)
Nebojša Radmanović, Chairman (2010–2011)
Željko Komšić, Chairman (2011–2012)
Bakir Izetbegović, Chairman (2012)
Nebojša Radmanović, Chairman (2012–2013)
Željko Komšić, Chairman (2013–2014)
Bakir Izetbegović, Chairman (2014)
Mladen Ivanić, Chairman (2014–2015)
Dragan Čović, Chairman (2015–2016)
Bakir Izetbegović, Chairman (2016)
Mladen Ivanić, Chairman (2016–2017)
Dragan Čović, Chairman (2017–2018)
Bakir Izetbegović, Chairman (2018)
Milorad Dodik, Chairman (2018–2019)
Željko Komšić, Chairman (2019–2020)
Šefik Džaferović, Chairman (2020)
Milorad Dodik, Chairman (2020–2021)
Željko Komšić, Chairman (2021–2022)
Šefik Džaferović, Chairman (2022)
Željka Cvijanović, Chairwoman (2022–present)
Bosniak members of the Presidency (complete list) –
Halid Genjac, Member (2000–2001)
Beriz Belkić, Member (2001–2002)
Sulejman Tihić, Member (2002–2006)
Haris Silajdžić, Member (2006–2010)
Bakir Izetbegović, Member (2010–2018)
Šefik Džaferović, Member (2018–2022)
Denis Bećirović, Member (2022–present)
Croat members of the Presidency (complete list) –
Ante Jelavić, Member (1998–2001)
Jozo Križanović, Member (2001–2002)
Dragan Čović, Member (2002–2005)
Ivo Miro Jović, Member (2005–2006)
Željko Komšić, Member (2006–2014)
Dragan Čović, Member (2014–2018)
Željko Komšić, Member (2018–present)
Serb members of the Presidency (complete list) –
Živko Radišić, Member (1998–2002)
Mirko Šarović, Member (2002–2003)
Borislav Paravac, Member (2003–2006)
Nebojša Radmanović, Member (2006–2014)
Mladen Ivanić, Member (2014–2018)
Milorad Dodik, Member (2018–2022)
Željka Cvijanović, Member (2022–present)
Chairmen of the Council of Ministers (complete list) –
Martin Raguž, Chairman (2000–2001)
Božidar Matić, Chairman (2001)
Zlatko Lagumdžija, Chairman (2001–2002)
Dragan Mikerević, Chairman (2002)
Adnan Terzić, Chairman (2002–2007)
Nikola Špirić, Chairman (2007–2012)
Vjekoslav Bevanda, Chairman (2012–2015)
Denis Zvizdić, Chairman (2015–2019)
Zoran Tegeltija, Chairman (2019–2023)
Borjana Krišto, Chairwoman (2023–present)

Bulgaria
Presidents (complete list) –
Petar Stoyanov, President (1997–2002)
Georgi Parvanov, President (2002–2012)
Rosen Plevneliev, President (2012–2017)
Rumen Radev, President (2017–present)
Prime ministers (complete list) –
Ivan Yordanov Kostov, Prime minister (1997–2001)
Simeon Saxe-Coburg-Gotha, Prime minister (2001–2005)
Sergei Stanishev, Prime minister (2005–2009)
Boyko Borisov, Prime minister (2009–2013)
Marin Raykov, Acting Prime minister (2013)
Plamen Oresharski, Prime minister (2013–2014)
Georgi Bliznashki, Acting Prime minister (2014)
Boyko Borisov, Prime minister (2014–2017)
Ognyan Gerdzhikov, Acting Prime minister (2017)
Boyko Borisov, Prime minister (2017–2021)
Stefan Yanev, Acting Prime minister (2021)
Kiril Petkov, Prime minister (2021–2022)
Galab Donev, Prime minister (2022–present)

Croatia
Presidents (complete list) –
Stjepan Mesić, President (2000–2010)
Ivo Josipović, President (2010–2015)
Kolinda Grabar-Kitarović, President (2015–2020)
Zoran Milanović, President (2020–present)
Prime ministers (complete list) –
Ivica Račan, Prime minister (2000–2003)
Ivo Sanader, Prime minister (2003–2009)
Jadranka Kosor, Prime minister (2009–2011)
Zoran Milanović, Prime minister (2011–2016)
Tihomir Orešković, Prime minister (2016)
Andrej Plenković, Prime minister (2016–present)

Greece: Third Republic
Presidents (complete list) –
Konstantinos Stephanopoulos, President (1995–2005)
Karolos Papoulias, President (2005–2015)
Prokopis Pavlopoulos, President (2015–2020)
Katerina Sakellaropoulou, President (2020–present)
Prime ministers (complete list) –
Costas Simitis, Prime minister (1996–2004)
Kostas Karamanlis, Prime minister (2004–2009)
George Papandreou, Prime minister (2009–2011)
Lucas Papademos, Prime minister (2011–2012)
Panagiotis Pikrammenos, Interim Prime minister (2012)
Antonis Samaras, Prime minister (2012–2015)
Alexis Tsipras, Prime minister (2015)
Vassiliki Thanou-Christophilou, Interim Prime minister (2015)
Alexis Tsipras, Prime minister (2015–2019)
Kyriakos Mitsotakis, Prime minister (2019–present)

UN-administered Kosovo
Presidents (complete list) –
Ibrahim Rugova, President (2002–2006)
Nexhat Daci, acting President (2006)
Fatmir Sejdiu, President (2006–2010)
Prime ministers (complete list) –
Bajram Rexhepi, Prime minister (2002–2004)
Ramush Haradinaj, Prime minister (2004–2005)
Adem Salihaj, acting Prime minister (2005)
Bajram Kosumi, Prime minister (2005–2006)
Agim Çeku, Prime minister (2006–2008)
Hashim Thaçi, Prime minister (2008)

Republic of Kosovo
Presidents (complete list) –
Fatmir Sejdiu, President (2008–2010)
Jakup Krasniqi, Acting President (2010–2011)
Behgjet Pacolli, President (2011)
Jakup Krasniqi, Acting President (2011)
Atifete Jahjaga, President (2011–2016)
Hashim Thaçi, President (2016–2020)
Vjosa Osmani, Acting President (2020–2021)
Glauk Konjufca, Acting President (2021)
Vjosa Osmani, President (2021–present)
Prime ministers (complete list) –
Hashim Thaçi, Prime minister (2008–2014)
Isa Mustafa, Prime minister (2014–2017)
Ramush Haradinaj, Prime minister (2017–2020)
Albin Kurti, Prime minister (2020)
Avdullah Hoti, Prime minister (2020–2021)
Albin Kurti, Prime minister (2021–present)

Republic of Macedonia/North Macedonia
Presidents (complete list) –
Boris Trajkovski, President (1999–2004)
Branko Crvenkovski, President (2004–2009)
Gjorge Ivanov, President (2009–2019)
Stevo Pendarovski, President (2019–present)
Prime ministers (complete list) –
Ljubčo Georgievski, Prime minister (1998–2002)
Branko Crvenkovski, Prime minister (2002–2004)
Radmila Šekerinska, Acting Prime minister (2004)
Hari Kostov, Prime minister (2004)
Radmila Šekerinska, Acting Prime minister (2004)
Vlado Bučkovski, Prime minister (2004–2006)
Nikola Gruevski, Prime minister (2006–2016)
Emil Dimitriev, Prime minister (2016–2017)
Zoran Zaev, Prime minister (2017–2020)
Oliver Spasovski, Prime minister (2020)
Zoran Zaev, Prime minister (2020–2022)
Dimitar Kovačevski, Prime minister (2022–present)

Yugoslavia: Federal Republic of Yugoslavia/Serbia and Montenegro
Presidents (complete list) –
Vojislav Koštunica, President (2000–2003)
Svetozar Marović, President (2003–2006)
Prime ministers (complete list) –
Zoran Žižić, Prime minister (2000–2001)
Dragiša Pešić, Prime minister (2001–2003)

Montenegro
Presidents (complete list) –
Filip Vujanović, President (2006–2018)
Milo Đukanović, President (2018–present)
Prime ministers (complete list) –
Milo Đukanović, Prime minister (2006)
Željko Šturanović, Prime minister (2006–2008)
Milo Đukanović, Prime minister (2008–2010)
Igor Lukšić, Prime minister (2010–2012)
Milo Đukanović, Prime minister (2012–2016)
Duško Marković, Prime minister (2016–2020)
Zdravko Krivokapić, Prime minister (2020–2022)
Dritan Abazovic, Prime minister (2022–present)

Serbia
Presidents (complete list) –
Boris Tadić, President (2004–2012)
Slavica Đukić Dejanović, Acting President (2012)
Tomislav Nikolić, President (2012–2017)
Aleksandar Vučić, President (2017–present)
Prime ministers (complete list) –
Vojislav Koštunica, Prime minister (2004–2008)
Mirko Cvetković, Prime minister (2008–2012)
Ivica Dačić, Prime minister (2012–2014)
Aleksandar Vučić, Prime minister (2014–2017)
Ivica Dačić, Acting Prime minister (2017)
Ana Brnabić, Prime minister (2017–present)

Slovenia
Presidents (complete list) –
Milan Kučan, President (1991–2002)
Janez Drnovšek, President (2002–2007)
Danilo Türk, President (2007–2012)
Borut Pahor, President (2012–2022)
Nataša Pirc Musar, President (2022–present)
Prime ministers (complete list) –
Janez Drnovšek, Prime minister (2000–2002)
Anton Rop, Prime minister (2002–2004)
Janez Janša, Prime minister (2004–2008)
Borut Pahor, Prime minister (2008–2012)
Janez Janša, Prime minister (2012–2013)
Alenka Bratušek, Prime minister (2013–2014)
Miro Cerar, Prime minister (2014–2018)
Marjan Šarec, Prime minister (2018–2020)
Janez Janša, Prime minister (2020–2022)
Robert Golob, Prime minister (2022–present)

Europe: Baltic states 

Estonia
Presidents (complete list) –
Lennart Meri, President (1992–2001)
Arnold Rüütel, President (2001–2006)
Toomas Hendrik Ilves, President (2006–2016)
Kersti Kaljulaid, President (2016–2021)
Alar Karis, President (2021–present)
Prime ministers (complete list) –
Mart Laar, Prime minister (1999–2002)
Siim Kallas, Prime minister (2002–2003)
Juhan Parts, Prime minister (2003–2005)
Andrus Ansip, Prime minister (2005–2014)
Taavi Rõivas, Prime minister (2014–2016)
Jüri Ratas, Prime minister (2016–2021)
Kaja Kallas, Prime minister (2021–present)

Latvia
Presidents (complete list) –
Vaira Vīķe-Freiberga, President (1999–2007)
Valdis Zatlers, President (2007–2011)
Andris Bērziņš, President (2011–2015)
Raimonds Vējonis, President (2015–2019)
Egils Levits, President (2019–present)
Prime ministers (complete list) –
Andris Bērziņš, Prime minister (2000–2002)
Einars Repše, Prime minister (2002–2004)
Indulis Emsis, Prime minister (2004)
Aigars Kalvītis, Prime minister (2004–2007)
Ivars Godmanis, Prime minister (2007–2009)
Valdis Dombrovskis, Prime minister (2009–2014)
Laimdota Straujuma, Prime minister (2014–2016)
Māris Kučinskis, Prime minister (2016–2019)
Arturs Krišjānis Kariņš, Prime minister (2019–present)

Lithuania
Presidents (complete list) –
Valdas Adamkus, President (1998–2003)
Rolandas Paksas, President (2003–2004)
Artūras Paulauskas, Acting President (2004)
Valdas Adamkus, President (2004–2009)
Dalia Grybauskaitė, President (2009–2019)
Gitanas Nausėda, President (2019–present)
Prime ministers (complete list) –
Rolandas Paksas, Prime minister (2000–2001)
Eugenijus Gentvilas, Acting Prime minister (2001)
Algirdas Brazauskas, Prime minister (2001–2006)
Zigmantas Balčytis, Acting Prime minister (2006)
Gediminas Kirkilas, Prime minister (2006–2008)
Andrius Kubilius, Prime minister (2008–2012)
Algirdas Butkevičius, Prime minister (2012–2016)
Saulius Skvernelis, Prime minister (2016–2020)
Ingrida Šimonytė, Prime minister (2020–present)

Europe: British Isles

Republic of Ireland
Presidents (complete list) –
Mary McAleese, President (1997–2011)
Michael D. Higgins, President (2011–present)
Taoiseachs (complete list) –
Bertie Ahern, Taoiseach (1997–2008)
Brian Cowen, Taoiseach (2008–2011)
Enda Kenny, Taoiseach (2011–2017)
Leo Varadkar, Taoiseach (2017–2020)
Micheál Martin, Taoiseach (2020–2022)
Leo Varadkar, Taoiseach (2022–present)

United Kingdom
Monarchs (complete list) –
Elizabeth II, Queen (1952–2022)
Charles III, King (2022–present)
Prime Ministers (complete list) –
Tony Blair, Prime Minister (1997–2007)
Gordon Brown, Prime Minister (2007–2010)
David Cameron, Prime Minister (2010–2016)
Theresa May, Prime Minister (2016–2019)
Boris Johnson, Prime Minister (2019–2022)
Liz Truss, Prime Minister (2022)
Rishi Sunak, Prime Minister (2022–present)

Europe: Central

Austria
Presidents (complete list) –
Thomas Klestil, President (1992–2004)
Heinz Fischer, President (2004–2016)
Doris Bures, Karlheinz Kopf, Norbert Hofer, Joint Acting Presidents (2016–2017)
Alexander Van der Bellen, President (2017–present)
Chancellors (complete list) –
Wolfgang Schüssel, Chancellor (2000–2007)
Alfred Gusenbauer, Chancellor (2007–2008)
Werner Faymann, Chancellor (2008–2016)
Reinhold Mitterlehner, Acting Chancellor (2016)
Christian Kern, Chancellor (2016–2017)
Sebastian Kurz, Chancellor (2017–2019)
Brigitte Bierlein, Chancellor (2019–2020)
Sebastian Kurz, Chancellor (2020–2021)
Alexander Schallenberg, Chancellor (2021)
Karl Nehammer, Chancellor (2021–present)

Czech Republic
Presidents (complete list) –
Václav Havel, President (1993–2003)
Václav Klaus, President (2003–2013)
Miloš Zeman, President (2013–2023)
Petr Pavel, President (2023–present)
Prime ministers (complete list) –
Miloš Zeman, Prime Minister (1998–2002)
Vladimír Špidla, Prime Minister (2002–2004)
Stanislav Gross, Prime Minister (2004–2005)
Jiří Paroubek, Prime Minister (2005–2006)
Mirek Topolánek, Prime Minister (2006–2009)
Jan Fischer, Prime Minister (2009–2010)
Petr Nečas, Prime Minister (2010–2013)
Jiří Rusnok, Prime Minister (2013–2014)
Bohuslav Sobotka, Prime Minister (2014–2017)
Andrej Babiš, Prime Minister (2017–2021)
Petr Fiala, Prime Minister (2021–present)

Germany
Presidents (complete list) –
Johannes Rau, President (1999–2004)
Horst Köhler, President (2004–2010)
Christian Wulff, President (2010–2012)
Joachim Gauck, President (2012–2017)
Frank-Walter Steinmeier, President (2017–present)
Chancellors (complete list) –
Gerhard Schröder, Chancellor (1998–2005)
Angela Merkel, Chancellor (2005–2021)
Olaf Scholz, Chancellor (2021–present)

Hungary
Presidents (complete list) –
Ferenc Mádl, President (2000–2005)
László Sólyom, President (2005–2010)
Pál Schmitt, President (2010–2012)
László Kövér, Acting President (2012)
János Áder, President (2012–2022)
Katalin Novák, President (2022–present)
Prime ministers (complete list) –
Viktor Orbán, Prime minister (1998–2002)
Péter Medgyessy, Prime minister (2002–2004)
Ferenc Gyurcsány, Prime minister (2004–2009)
Gordon Bajnai, Prime minister (2009–2010)
Viktor Orbán, Prime minister (2010–present)

Liechtenstein
Sovereign Princes (complete list) –
Hans-Adam II, Prince (1989–present)
Prime ministers (complete list) –
Mario Frick, Prime minister (1993–2001)
Otmar Hasler, Prime minister (2001–2009)
Klaus Tschütscher, Prime minister (2009–2013)
Adrian Hasler, Prime minister (2013–2021)
Daniel Risch, Prime minister (2021–present)

Poland
Presidents (complete list) –
Aleksander Kwaśniewski, President (1995–2005)
Lech Kaczyński, President (2005–2010)
Bronisław Komorowski, Acting President (2010)
Bogdan Borusewicz, Acting President (2010)
Grzegorz Schetyna, Acting President (2010)
Bronisław Komorowski, President (2010–2015)
Andrzej Duda, President (2015–present)
Prime ministers (complete list) –
Jerzy Buzek, Prime minister (1997–2001)
Leszek Miller, Prime minister (2001–2004)
Marek Belka, Prime minister (2004–2005)
Kazimierz Marcinkiewicz, Prime minister (2005–2006)
Jarosław Kaczyński, Prime minister (2006–2007)
Donald Tusk, Prime minister (2007–2014)
Ewa Kopacz, Prime minister (2014–2015)
Beata Szydło, Prime minister (2015–2017)
Mateusz Morawiecki, Prime minister (2017–present)

Slovakia
Presidents (complete list) –
Rudolf Schuster, President (1999–2004)
Ivan Gašparovič, President (2004–2014)
Andrej Kiska, President (2014–2019)
Zuzana Čaputová, President (2019–present)
Prime ministers (complete list) –
Mikuláš Dzurinda, Prime minister (1998–2006)
Robert Fico, Prime minister (2006–2010)
Iveta Radičová, Prime minister (2010–2012)
Robert Fico, Prime minister (2012–2018)
Peter Pellegrini, Prime minister (2018–2020)
Igor Matovič, Prime minister (2020–2021)
Eduard Heger, Prime minister (2021–present)

Switzerland (complete list) –
Moritz Leuenberger, President of the Confederation (2001)
Kaspar Villiger, President of the Confederation (2002)
Pascal Couchepin, President of the Confederation (2003)
Joseph Deiss, President of the Confederation (2004)
Samuel Schmid, President of the Confederation (2005)
Moritz Leuenberger, President of the Confederation (2006)
Micheline Calmy-Rey, President of the Confederation (2007)
Pascal Couchepin, President of the Confederation (2008)
Hans-Rudolf Merz, President of the Confederation (2009)
Doris Leuthard, President of the Confederation (2010)
Micheline Calmy-Rey, President of the Confederation (2011)
Eveline Widmer-Schlumpf, President of the Confederation (2012)
Ueli Maurer, President of the Confederation (2013)
Didier Burkhalter, President of the Confederation (2014)
Simonetta Sommaruga, President of the Confederation (2015)
Johann Schneider-Ammann, President of the Confederation (2016)
Doris Leuthard, President of the Confederation (2017)
Alain Berset, President of the Confederation (2018)
Ueli Maurer, President of the Confederation (2019)
Simonetta Sommaruga, President of the Confederation (2020)
Guy Parmelin, President of the Confederation (2021)
Ignazio Cassis, President of the Confederation (2022)
Alain Berset, President of the Confederation (2023–present)

Europe: East

Belarus
Presidents (complete list) –
Alexander Lukashenko, President (1994–present)
Prime ministers (complete list) –
Vladimir Yermoshin, Prime minister (2000–2001)
Gennady Novitsky, Prime minister (2001–2003)
Sergei Sidorsky, Prime minister (2003–2010)
Mikhail Myasnikovich, Prime minister (2010–2014)
Andrei Kobyakov, Prime minister (2014–2018)
Syarhey Rumas, Prime minister (2018–2020)
Roman Golovchenko, Prime minister (2020–present)

Chechen Republic of Ichkeria (complete list) –
Abdul-Halim Sadulayev, President (2005–2006)
Dokka Umarov, President (2006–2007)

Moldova
Presidents (complete list) –
Petru Lucinschi, President (1997–2001)
Vladimir Voronin, President (2001–2009)
Mihai Ghimpu, Acting President (2009–2010)
Vlad Filat, Acting President (2010)
Marian Lupu, Acting President (2010–2012)
Nicolae Timofti, President (2012–2016)
Igor Dodon, President (2016–2020)
Maia Sandu, President (2020–present)
Prime ministers (complete list) –
Dumitru Braghiș, Prime minister (1999–2001)
Vasile Tarlev, Prime minister (2001–2008)
Zinaida Greceanîi, Prime minister (2008–2009)
Vitalie Pîrlog, Acting Prime minister (2009)
Vlad Filat, Prime minister (2009–2013)
Iurie Leancă, Prime minister (2013–2015)
Chiril Gaburici, Prime minister (2015)
Natalia Gherman, Acting Prime minister (2015)
Valeriu Streleț, Prime minister (2015)
Gheorghe Brega, Acting Prime minister (2015–2016)
Pavel Filip, Prime minister (2016–2019)
Maia Sandu, Prime minister (2019)
Ion Chicu, Prime minister (2019–2021)
Aureliu Ciocoi, Acting Prime minister (2021)
Natalia Gavrilița, Prime minister (2021–2023)
Dorin Recean, Prime minister (2023–present)

Romania
Presidents (complete list) –
Ion Iliescu, President (2000–2004)
Traian Băsescu, President (2004–2007)
Nicolae Văcăroiu, Interim President (2007)
Traian Băsescu, President (2007–2012)
Crin Antonescu, Interim President (2012)
Traian Băsescu, President (2012–2014)
Klaus Iohannis, President (2014–present)
Prime ministers (complete list) –
Adrian Năstase, Prime minister (2000–2004)
Eugen Bejinariu, Interim Prime minister (2004)
Călin Popescu-Tăriceanu, Prime minister (2004–2008)
Emil Boc, Prime minister (2008–2012)
Cătălin Predoiu, Interim Prime minister (2012)
Mihai Răzvan Ungureanu, Prime minister (2012)
Victor Ponta, Prime minister (2012–2015)
Gabriel Oprea, Interim Prime minister (2015)
Victor Ponta, Prime minister (2015)
Sorin Cîmpeanu, Interim Prime minister (2015)
Dacian Cioloș, Prime minister (2015–2017)
Sorin Grindeanu, Prime minister (2017)
Mihai Tudose, Prime minister (2017–2018)
Mihai Fifor, Interim Prime minister (2018)
Viorica Dăncilă, Prime minister (2018–2019)
Ludovic Orban, Prime minister (2019–2020)
Florin Cîțu, Prime minister (2020–2021)
Nicolae Ciucă, Prime minister (2021–present)

Russia
Presidents (complete list) –
Vladimir Putin, Acting President (1999–2000), President (2000–2008)
Dmitry Medvedev, President (2008–2012)
Vladimir Putin, President (2012–present)
Prime ministers (complete list) –
Mikhail Kasyanov, Prime minister (2000–2004)
Viktor Khristenko, Acting Prime minister (2004)
Mikhail Fradkov, Prime minister (2004–2007)
Viktor Zubkov, Prime minister (2007–2008)
Vladimir Putin, Prime minister (2008–2012)
Viktor Zubkov, Prime minister (2012)
Dmitry Medvedev, Prime minister (2012–2020)
Mikhail Mishustin, Prime minister (2020–present)

Transnistria
Presidents (complete list) –
Igor Smirnov, Chairman of the Republic (1991), President (1991–2011)
Yevgeny Shevchuk, President (2011–2016)
Vadim Krasnoselsky, President (2016–present)
Prime ministers (complete list) –
Pyotr Stepanov, Prime minister (2012–2013)
Tatiana Turanskaya, Prime minister (2013–2015)
Maija Parnas, Acting Prime Minister (2015)
Tatiana Turanskaya, Prime minister (2015)
Maija Parnas, Acting Prime Minister (2015)
Pavel Prokudin, Prime minister (2015–2016)
Aleksandr Martynov, Prime minister (2016–2022)
Aleksandr Rozenberg, Prime minister (2022–present)

Ukraine
Presidents (complete list) –
Leonid Kuchma, President (1994–2005)
Viktor Yushchenko, President (2005–2010)
Viktor Yanukovych, President (2010–2014)
Oleksandr Turchynov, Acting President (2014)
Petro Poroshenko, President (2014–2019)
Volodymyr Zelenskyy, President (2019–present)
Prime ministers (complete list) –
Viktor Yushchenko, Prime minister (1999–2001)
Anatoliy Kinakh, Prime minister (2001–2002)
Viktor Yanukovych, Prime minister (2002–2004)
Mykola Azarov, Acting Prime minister (2004)
Viktor Yanukovych, Prime minister (2004–2005)
Mykola Azarov, Acting Prime minister (2005)
Yulia Tymoshenko, Prime minister (2005)
Yuriy Yekhanurov, Prime minister (2005–2006)
Viktor Yanukovych, Prime minister (2006–2007)
Yulia Tymoshenko, Prime minister (2007–2010)
Oleksandr Turchynov, Acting Prime minister (2010)
Mykola Azarov, Prime minister (2010–2014)
Serhiy Arbuzov, Acting Prime minister (2014)
Oleksandr Turchynov, Acting Prime minister (2014)
Arseniy Yatsenyuk, Prime minister (2014–2016)
Volodymyr Groysman, Prime minister (2016–2019)
Oleksiy Honcharuk, Prime minister (2019–2020)
Denys Shmyhal, Prime minister (2020–present)

Europe: Nordic

Denmark
Monarchs (complete list) –
Margrethe II, Queen (1972–present)
Prime ministers (complete list) –
Poul Nyrup Rasmussen, Prime minister (1993–2001)
Anders Fogh Rasmussen, Prime minister (2001–2009)
Lars Løkke Rasmussen, Prime minister (2009–2011)
Helle Thorning-Schmidt, Prime minister (2011–2015)
Lars Løkke Rasmussen, Prime minister (2015–2019)
Mette Frederiksen, Prime minister (2019–present)

Finland
Presidents (complete list) –
Tarja Halonen, President (2000–2012)
Sauli Niinistö, President (2012–present)
Prime ministers (complete list) –
Paavo Lipponen, Prime minister (1995–2003)
Anneli Jäätteenmäki, Prime minister (2003)
Matti Vanhanen, Prime minister (2003–2010)
Mari Kiviniemi, Prime minister (2010–2011)
Jyrki Katainen, Prime minister (2011–2014)
Alexander Stubb, Prime minister (2014–2015)
Juha Sipilä, Prime minister (2015–2019)
Antti Rinne, Prime minister (2019)
Sanna Marin, Prime minister (2019–present)

Iceland
Presidents (complete list) –
Ólafur Ragnar Grímsson, President (1996–2016)
Guðni Th. Jóhannesson, President (2016–present)
Prime ministers (complete list) –
Davíð Oddsson, Prime minister (1991–2004)
Halldór Ásgrímsson, Prime minister (2004–2006)
Geir Haarde, Prime minister (2006–2009)
Jóhanna Sigurðardóttir, Prime minister (2009–2013)
Sigmundur Davíð Gunnlaugsson, Prime minister (2013–2016)
Sigurður Ingi Jóhannsson, Prime minister (2016–2017)
Bjarni Benediktsson, Prime minister (2017)
Katrín Jakobsdóttir, Prime minister (2017–present)

Norway
Monarchs (complete list) –
Harald V, King (1991–present)
Prime ministers (complete list) –
Jens Stoltenberg, Prime minister (2000–2001)
Kjell Magne Bondevik, Prime minister (2001–2005)
Jens Stoltenberg, Prime minister (2005–2013)
Erna Solberg, Prime minister (2013–2021)
Jonas Gahr Støre, Prime minister (2021–present)

Sweden
Monarchs (complete list) –
Carl XVI Gustaf, King (1973–present)
Prime ministers (complete list) –
Göran Persson, Prime minister (1996–2006)
Fredrik Reinfeldt, Prime minister (2006–2014)
Stefan Löfven, Prime minister (2014–2021)
Magdalena Andersson, Prime minister (2021–2022)
Ulf Kristersson, Prime minister (2022–present)

Europe: Southcentral

Italy
Presidents (complete list) –
Carlo Azeglio Ciampi, President (1999–2006)
Giorgio Napolitano, President (2006–2015)
Sergio Mattarella, President (2015–present)
Prime ministers (complete list) –
Giuliano Amato, Prime minister (2000–2001)
Silvio Berlusconi, Prime minister (2001–2006)
Romano Prodi, Prime minister (2006–2008)
Silvio Berlusconi, Prime minister (2008–2011)
Mario Monti, Prime minister (2011–2013)
Enrico Letta, Prime minister (2013–2014)
Matteo Renzi, Prime minister (2014–2016)
Paolo Gentiloni, Prime minister (2016–2018)
Giuseppe Conte, Prime Minister (2018–2021)
Mario Draghi, Prime Minister (2021–2022)
Giorgia Meloni, Prime Minister (2022–present)

Malta
Presidents (complete list) –
Guido de Marco, President (1999–2004)
Eddie Fenech Adami, President (2004–2009)
George Abela, President (2009–2014)
Marie-Louise Coleiro Preca, President (2014–2019)
George Vella, President (2019–present)
Prime ministers (complete list) –
Eddie Fenech Adami, Prime minister (1998–2004)
Lawrence Gonzi, Prime minister (2004–2013)
Joseph Muscat, Prime minister (2013–2020)
Robert Abela, Prime minister (2020–present)

San Marino
Captains Regent (1900–present) –
Gianfranco Terenzi, Enzo Colombini, Captains Regent (2000–2001)
Luigi Lonfernini, Fabio Berardi, Captains Regent (2001)
Alberto Cecchetti, Gino Giovagnoli, Captains Regent (2001–2002)
Antonio Lazzaro Volpinari, Giovanni Francesco Ugolini, Captains Regent (2002)
Mauro Chiaruzzi, Giuseppe Maria Morganti, Captains Regent (2002–2003)
Pier Marino Menicucci, Giovanni Giannoni, Captains Regent (2003)
Giovanni Lonfernini, Valeria Ciavatta, Captains Regent (2003–2004)
Paolo Bollini, Marino Riccardi, Captains Regent (2004)
Giuseppe Arzilli, Roberto Raschi, Captains Regent (2004–2005)
Fausta Morganti, Cesare Gasperoni, Captains Regent (2005)
Claudio Muccioli, Antonello Bacciocchi, Captains Regent (2005–2006)
Gianfranco Terenzi, Loris Francini, Captains Regent (2006)
Antonio Carattoni, Roberto Giorgetti, Captains Regent (2006–2007)
Alessandro Mancini, Alessandro Rossi, Captains Regent (2007)
Mirko Tomassoni, Alberto Selva, Captains Regent (2007–2008)
Rosa Zafferani, Federico Pedini Amati, Captains Regent (2008)
Ernesto Benedettini, Assunta Meloni, Captains Regent (2008–2009)
Oscar Mina, Massimo Cenci, Captains Regent (2009)
Stefano Palmieri, Francesco Mussoni , Captains Regent (2009–2010)
Marco Conti, Glauco Sansovini, Captains Regent (2010)
Giovanni Francesco Ugolini, Andrea Zafferani, Captains Regent (2010–2011)
Maria Luisa Berti, Filippo Tamagnini, Captains Regent (2011)
Gabriele Gatti, Matteo Fiorini, Captains Regent (2011–2012)
Italo Righi, Maurizio Rattini, Captains Regent (2012)
Teodoro Lonfernini, Denise Bronzetti, Captains Regent (2012–2013)
Antonella Mularoni, Denis Amici, Captains Regent (2013)
Gian Carlo Capicchioni, Anna Maria Muccioli, Captains Regent (2013–2014)
Valeria Ciavatta, Luca Beccari, Captains Regent (2014)
Gianfranco Terenzi, Guerrino Zanotti, Captains Regent (2014–2015)
Andrea Belluzzi, Roberto Venturini, Captains Regent (2015)
Lorella Stefanelli, Nicola Renzi, Captains Regent (2015–2016)
Massimo Andrea Ugolini, Gian Nicola Berti, Captains Regent (2016)
Marino Riccardi, Fabio Berardi, Captains Regent (2016–2017)
Mimma Zavoli, Vanessa D'Ambrosio, Captains Regent (2017)
Enrico Carattoni, Matteo Fiorini, Captains Regent (2017–2018)
Stefano Palmieri, Matteo Ciacci, Captains Regent (2018)
Mirko Tomassoni, Luca Santolini, Captains Regent (2018–2019)
Nicola Selva, Michele Muratori, Captains Regent (2019)
Luca Boschi, Mariella Mularoni, Captains Regent (2019–2020)
Alessandro Mancini, Grazia Zafferani, Captains Regent (2020)
Alessandro Cardelli, Mirko Dolcini, Captains Regent (2020–2021)
Gian Carlo Venturini, Marco Nicolini, Captains Regent (2021)
Francesco Mussoni, Giacomo Simoncini, Captains Regent (2021–2022)
Oscar Mina, Paolo Rondelli, Captains Regent (2022)
Maria Luisa Berti, Manuel Ciavatta, Captains Regent (2022–present)

Vatican City
Sovereign (complete list) –
John Paul II, Sovereign (1978–2005)
Benedict XVI, Sovereign (2005–2013)
Francis, Sovereign (2013–present)
President of the Governorate (complete list) –
Edmund Szoka, President of the Governorate (1997–2006)
Giovanni Lajolo, President of the Governorate (2006–2011)
Giuseppe Bertello, President of the Governorate (2011–2021)
Fernando Vérgez Alzaga, President of the Governorate (2021–present)

Europe: Southwest

Andorra
Episcopal Co-Princes (complete list) –
Joan Martí i Alanis, Episcopal Co-Prince (1971–2003)
Joan Enric Vives Sicília, Episcopal Co-Prince (2003–present)
French Co-Princes (complete list) –
Jacques Chirac, French Co-Prince (1995–2007)
Nicolas Sarkozy, French Co-Prince (2007–2012)
François Hollande, French Co-Prince (2012–2017)
Emmanuel Macron, French Co-Prince (2017–present)
Prime ministers (complete list) –
Marc Forné Molné, Prime minister (1994–2005)
Albert Pintat, Prime minister (2005–2009)
Jaume Bartumeu, Prime minister (2009–2011)
Pere López Agràs, Acting Prime minister (2011)
Antoni Martí, Prime minister (2011–2019)
Xavier Espot, Prime minister (2019–)

Portugal
Presidents (complete list) –
Jorge Sampaio, President (1996–2006)
Aníbal Cavaco Silva, President (2006–2016)
Marcelo Rebelo de Sousa, President (2016–present)
Prime ministers (complete list) –
António Guterres, Prime minister (1995–2002)
José Manuel Barroso, Prime minister (2002–2004)
Pedro Santana Lopes, Prime minister (2004–2005)
José Sócrates, Prime minister (2005–2011)
Pedro Passos Coelho, Prime minister (2011–2015)
António Costa, Prime minister (2015–present)

Kingdom of Spain
Monarchs (complete list) –
Juan Carlos I, King (1975–2014)
Felipe VI, King (2014–present)
Prime ministers (complete list) –
José María Aznar, Prime minister (1996–2004)
José Luis Rodríguez Zapatero, Prime minister (2004–2011)
Mariano Rajoy, Prime minister (2011–2018)
Pedro Sánchez, Prime Minister (2018–present)

Europe: West

Belgium
Monarchs (complete list) –
Albert II, King (1993–2013)
Philippe, King (2013–present)
Prime ministers (complete list) –
Guy Verhofstadt, Prime minister (1999–2008)
Yves Leterme, Prime minister (2008)
Herman Van Rompuy, Prime minister (2008–2009)
Yves Leterme, Prime minister (2009–2011)
Elio Di Rupo, Prime minister (2011–2014)
Charles Michel, Prime minister (2014–2019)
Sophie Wilmès, Prime minister (2019–2020)
Alexander De Croo, Prime minister (2020–present)

France: French Fifth Republic
Presidents (complete list) –
Jacques Chirac, President (1995–2007)
Nicolas Sarkozy, President (2007–2012)
François Hollande, President (2012–2017)
Emmanuel Macron, President (2017–present)
Prime ministers (complete list) –
Lionel Jospin, Prime minister (1997–2002)
Jean-Pierre Raffarin, Prime minister (2002–2005)
Dominique de Villepin, Prime minister (2005–2007)
François Fillon, Prime minister (2007–2012)
Jean-Marc Ayrault, Prime minister (2012–2014)
Manuel Valls, Prime minister (2014–2016)
Bernard Cazeneuve, Prime minister (2016–2017)
Édouard Philippe, Prime minister (2017–2020)
Jean Castex, Prime minister (2020–2022)
Élisabeth Borne, Prime minister (2022–present)

Luxembourg
Monarchs (complete list) –
Henri, Grand Duke (2000–present)
Prime ministers (complete list) –
Jean-Claude Juncker, Prime minister (1995–2013)
Xavier Bettel, Prime minister (2013–present)

Monaco
Sovereign Prince (complete list) –
Rainier III, Prince (1949–2005)
Albert II, Prince (2005–present)
Minister of State (complete list) –
Patrick Leclercq, Minister of state (2000–2005)
Jean-Paul Proust, Minister of state (2005–2010)
Michel Roger, Minister of state (2010–2015)
Gilles Tonelli, Acting Minister of state (2015–2016)
Serge Telle, Minister of State (2016–2020)
Pierre Dartout, Minister of State (2020–present)

Kingdom of the Netherlands
Monarchs (complete list) –
Beatrix, Queen (1980–2013)
Willem-Alexander, King (2013–present)
Prime ministers of the Netherlands; Chairman of the Council of Ministers of the Kingdom of the Netherlands (complete list) –
Wim Kok, Prime minister (1994–2002)
Jan Peter Balkenende, Prime minister (2002–2010)
Mark Rutte, Prime minister (2010–present)

Eurasia: Caucasus

Abkhazia, has limited recognition: Georgia claims Abkhazia
Presidents (complete list) –
Vladislav Ardzinba, President (1994–2005)
Sergei Bagapsh, President (2005–2011)
Alexander Ankvab, Acting President (2011), President (2011–2014)
Valeri Bganba, Acting President (2014)
Raul Khajimba, President (2014–2020)
Valeri Bganba, Acting President (2020)
Aslan Bzhania, President (2020–present)
Prime ministers (complete list) –
Viacheslav Tsugba, Prime minister (1999–2001)
Anri Jergenia, Prime minister (2001–2002)
Gennadi Gagulia, Prime minister (2002–2003)
Raul Khajimba, Prime minister (2003–2004)
Nodar Khashba, Prime minister (2004–2005)
Alexander Ankvab, Prime minister (2005–2010)
Sergei Shamba, Prime minister (2010–2011)
Leonid Lakerbaia, Prime minister (2011–2014)
Vladimir Delba, Acting Prime minister (2014)
Beslan Butba, Prime minister (2014–2015)
Shamil Adzynba, Acting Prime minister (2015)
Artur Mikvabia, Prime minister (2015–2016)
Shamil Adzynba, Acting Prime minister (2016)
Beslan Bartsits, Prime minister (2016–2018)
Gennadi Gagulia, Prime minister (2018)
Daur Arshba, Acting Prime minister (2018)
Valeri Bganba, Prime minister (2018–2020)
Alexander Ankvab, Prime minister (2020–present)

Armenia
Presidents (complete list) –
Robert Kocharyan, President (1998–2008)
Serzh Sargsyan, President (2008–2018)
Armen Sarkissian, President (2018–2022)
Alen Simonyan, Acting president (2022)
Vahagn Khachaturyan, President (2022–present)
Prime ministers (complete list) –
Andranik Margaryan, Prime minister (2000–2007)
Serzh Sargsyan, Prime minister (2007–2008)
Tigran Sargsyan, Prime minister (2008–2014)
Hovik Abrahamyan, Prime minister (2014–2016)
Karen Karapetyan, Prime minister (2016–2018)
Serzh Sargsyan, Prime minister (2018)
Karen Karapetyan, Acting prime minister (2018)
Nikol Pashinyan, Prime minister (2018–present)

Republic of Artsakh
Presidents (complete list) –
Arkadi Ghukasyan, President (1997–2007)
Bako Sahakyan, President (2007–2020)
Arayik Harutyunyan, President (2020–present)
Presidents of the National Assembly (complete list) –
Oleg Yesayan, President of the National Assembly (1997–2005)
Ashot Ghulian, President of the National Assembly (2005–2020)
Arthur Tovmasyan, President of the National Assembly (2020–present)

Azerbaijan
Presidents (complete list) –
Heydar Aliyev, President (1993–2003)
Ilham Aliyev, President (2003–present)
Prime ministers (complete list) –
Artur Rasizade, Prime minister (1996–2003)
Ilham Aliyev, Prime minister (2003)
Artur Rasizade, Prime minister (2003–2018)
Novruz Mammadov, Prime minister (2018–2019)
Ali Asadov, Prime minister (2019–present)

Georgia
Presidents (complete list) –
Eduard Shevardnadze, President (1992–2003)
Nino Burjanadze, Acting President (2003–2004)
Mikheil Saakashvili, President (2004–2007)
Nino Burjanadze, Acting President (2007–2008)
Mikheil Saakashvili, President (2008–2013)
Giorgi Margvelashvili, President (2013–2018)
Salome Zourabichvili, President (2018–present)
Heads of government (complete list) –
Giorgi Arsenishvili, State minister (2000–2001)
Avtandil Jorbenadze, State minister (2001–2003)
Zurab Zhvania, State minister (2003–2004), Prime minister (2004–2005)
Mikheil Saakashvili, Acting President (2005)
Zurab Noghaideli, Prime minister (2005–2007)
Giorgi Baramidze, Acting Prime minister (2007)
Lado Gurgenidze, Prime minister (2007–2008)
Grigol Mgaloblishvili, Prime minister (2008–2009)
Nika Gilauri, Prime minister (2009–2012)
Vano Merabishvili, Prime minister (2012)
Bidzina Ivanishvili, Prime minister (2012–2013)
Irakli Garibashvili, Prime minister (2013–2015)
Giorgi Kvirikashvili, Prime minister (2015–2018)
Mamuka Bakhtadze, Prime minister (2018–2019)
Giorgi Gakharia, Prime minister (2019–2021)
Irakli Garibashvili, Prime minister (2021–present)

South Ossetia, has limited recognition: Georgia claims South Ossetia
Presidents (complete list) –
Lyudvig Chibirov, Head of state (1993–2001), President (1996–2001)
Eduard Kokoity, President (2001–2011)
Vadim Brovtsev, Acting President (2011–2012)
Leonid Tibilov, President (2012–2017)
Anatoly Bibilov, President (2017–2022)
Alan Gagloev, President (2022–present)
Prime ministers (complete list) –
Merab Chigoev, Prime minister (1998–2001)
Dmitry Sanakoyev, Prime minister (2001)
Gerasim Khugayev, Prime minister (2001–2003) 
Igor Sanakoyev, Prime minister (2003–2005)
Zurab Kokoyev, Acting Prime minister (2005)
Yury Morozov, Prime minister (2005–2008)
Boris Chochiev, Acting Prime minister (2008)
Aslanbek Bulatsev, Prime minister (2008–2009)
Vadim Brovtsev, Prime minister (2009–2012)
Rostislav Khugayev, Prime minister (2012–2014)
Domenty Kulumbegov, Prime minister (2014–2017)
Erik Pukhayev, Prime minister (2017–2020)
Gennady Bekoyev, Acting Prime minister (2020–2022)
Konstantin Dzhussoev, Prime minister (2022–present)

Oceania

Oceania: Australia and Papua New Guinea

Australia
Monarchs (complete list) –
Elizabeth II, Queen (1952–2022)
Charles III, King (2022–present)
Prime ministers (complete list) –
John Howard, Prime minister (1996–2007)
Kevin Rudd, Prime minister (2007–2010)
Julia Gillard, Prime minister (2010–2013)
Kevin Rudd, Prime minister (2013)
Tony Abbott, Prime minister (2013–2015)
Malcolm Turnbull, Prime minister (2015–2018)
Scott Morrison, Prime minister (2018–2022)
Anthony Albanese, Prime minister (2022–present)

Papua New Guinea
Monarchs (complete list) –
Elizabeth II, Queen (1975–2022)
Charles III, King (2022–present)
Prime ministers (complete list) –
Mekere Morauta, Prime minister (1999–2002)
Michael Somare, Prime minister (2002–2012)
Sam Abal, Acting Prime minister (2010–2011)
Michael Somare, Prime minister (2011)
Sam Abal, Acting Prime minister (2011)
Peter O'Neill, Prime minister (2011–2019)
James Marape, Prime minister (2019–present)

Oceania: Pacific

Cook Islands, state in free association
Queen's Representative (complete list) –
Laurence Murray Greig, Acting Queen's representative (2000–2001)
Frederick Tutu Goodwin, Queen's representative (2001–2013)
Tom Marsters, Queen's representative (2013–present)
Prime ministers
Terepai Maoate, Prime minister (1999–2002)
Robert Woonton, Prime minister (2002–2004)
Jim Marurai, Prime minister (2004–2010)
Henry Puna, Prime minister (2010–2020)
Mark Brown, Prime minister (2020–present)

Fiji
Heads of state (complete list) –
Josefa Iloilo, President (2000–2006)
Frank Bainimarama, Head of the interim military government (2006–2007)
Josefa Iloilo, President (2007–2009)
Epeli Nailatikau, President (2009–2015)
Jioji Konrote, President (2015–2021)
Wiliame Katonivere, President (2021–present)
Prime ministers (complete list) –
Laisenia Qarase, Prime minister (2000–2001)
Tevita Momoedonu, Acting Prime minister (2001)
Laisenia Qarase, Prime minister (2001–2006)
2006 Fijian coup d'état
Jona Senilagakali, Acting Prime minister (2006–2007)
Frank Bainimarama, Acting Prime minister (2007–2014), Prime minister (2014–2022)
Sitiveni Rabuka, Prime minister (2022–present)

Kiribati (complete list) –
Teburoro Tito, President (1994–2003)
Tion Otang, Acting President (2003)
Anote Tong, President (2003–2016)
Taneti Mamau, President (2016–present)

Marshall Islands (complete list) –
Kessai Note, President (2000–2008)
Litokwa Tomeing, President (2008–2009)
Ruben Zackhras, Acting President (2009)
Jurelang Zedkaia, President (2009–2012)
Christopher Loeak, President (2012–2016)
Casten Nemra, President (2016)
Hilda Heine, President (2016–2020)
David Kabua, President (2020–present)

Federated States of Micronesia (complete list) –
Leo Falcam, President (1999–2003)
Joseph J. Urusemal, President (2003–2007)
Manny Mori, President (2007–2015)
Peter M. Christian, President (2015–2019)
David W. Panuelo, President (2019–present)

Nauru (complete list) –
Bernard Dowiyogo, President (2000–2001)
René Harris, President (2001–2003)
Bernard Dowiyogo, President (2003)
René Harris, President (2003)
Bernard Dowiyogo, President (2003)
Derog Gioura, President (2003)
Ludwig Scotty, President (2003)
René Harris, President (2003–2004)
Ludwig Scotty, President (2004–2007)
Marcus Stephen, President (2007–2011)
Freddie Pitcher, President (2011)
Sprent Dabwido, President (2011–2013)
Baron Waqa, President (2013–2019)
Lionel Aingimea, President (2019–2022)
Russ Kun, President (2022–present)

New Zealand
Monarchs (complete list) –
Elizabeth II, Queen (1952–2022)
Charles III, King (2022–present)
Prime ministers (complete list) –
Helen Clark, Prime minister (1999–2008)
John Key, Prime minister (2008–2016)
Bill English, Prime minister (2016–2017)
Jacinda Ardern, Prime minister (2017–2023)
Chris Hipkins, Prime minister (2023–present)

Palau (complete list) –
Kuniwo Nakamura, President (1993–2001)
Tommy Remengesau Jr., President (2001–2009)
Johnson Toribiong, President (2009–2013)
Tommy Remengesau Jr., President (2013–2021)
Surangel Whipps Jr., President (2021–present)

Samoa
Heads of state (complete list) –
Malietoa Tanumafili II, O le Ao o le Malo (1962–2007)
Tui Ātua Tupua Tamasese Efi, O le Ao o le Malo (2007–2017)
Tuimalealiʻifano Vaʻaletoʻa Sualauvi II, O le Ao o le Malo (2017–present)
Prime ministers (complete list) –
Tuila'epa Sa'ilele Malielegaoi, Prime minister (1998–2021)
Fiamē Naomi Mataʻafa, Prime minister (2021–present)

Solomon Islands
Monarchs (complete list) –
Elizabeth II, Queen (1978–2022)
Charles III, King (2022–present)
Prime ministers (complete list) –
Manasseh Sogavare, Prime minister (2000–2001)
Allan Kemakeza, Prime minister (2001–2006)
Snyder Rini, Prime minister (2006)
Manasseh Sogavare, Prime minister (2006–2007)
Derek Sikua, Prime minister (2007–2010)
Danny Philip, Prime minister (2010–2011)
Gordon Darcy Lilo, Prime minister (2011–2014)
Manasseh Sogavare, Prime minister (2014–2017)
Rick Houenipwela, Prime minister (2017–2019)
Manasseh Sogavare, Prime minister (2019–present)

Tonga
Monarchs (complete list) –
Tāufaʻāhau Tupou IV, King (1965–2006)
George Tupou V, King (2006–2012)
Tupou VI, King (2012–present)
Prime ministers (complete list) –
Tupou VI, then known as ʻAhoʻeitu ʻUnuakiʻotonga Tukuʻaho, Prime minister (2000–2006)
Feleti Sevele, Prime minister (2006–2010)
Sialeʻataongo Tuʻivakanō, Prime minister (2010–2014)
ʻAkilisi Pōhiva, Prime minister (2014–2019)
Semisi Sika, Acting Prime minister (2019)
Pōhiva Tuʻiʻonetoa, Prime minister (2019–2021)
Siaosi Sovaleni, Prime minister (2021–present)

Tuvalu
Monarchs (complete list) –
Elizabeth II, Queen (1978–2022)
Charles III, King (2022–present)
Prime ministers (complete list) –
Lagitupu Tuilimu, Acting Prime minister (2000–2001)
Faimalaga Luka, Prime minister (2001)
Koloa Talake, Prime minister (2001–2002)
Saufatu Sopoanga, Prime minister (2002–2004)
Maatia Toafa, Prime minister (2004–2006)
Apisai Ielemia, Prime minister (2006–2010)
Maatia Toafa, Prime minister (2010)
Willy Telavi, Prime minister (2010–2013)
Enele Sopoaga, Prime minister (2013–2019)
Kausea Natano, Prime minister (2019–present)

Vanuatu
Presidents (complete list) –
John Bani, President (1999–2004)
Roger Abiut, Acting President (2004)
Alfred Maseng, President (2004)
Josias Moli, Acting President (2004)
Kalkot Mataskelekele, President (2004–2009)
Maxime Carlot Korman, Acting President (2009)
Iolu Abil, President (2009–2014)
Philip Boedoro, Acting President (2014)
Baldwin Lonsdale, President (2014–2017)
Esmon Saimon, Acting President (2017)
Tallis Obed Moses, President (2017–2022)
Nikenike Vurobaravu, President (2022–present)
Prime ministers (complete list) –
Barak Sopé, Prime minister (1999–2001)
Edward Natapei, Prime minister (2001–2004)
Serge Vohor, Prime minister (2004)
Ham Lini, Prime minister (2004–2008)
Edward Natapei, Prime minister (2008–2009)
Serge Vohor, Acting Prime minister (2009)
Edward Natapei, Prime minister (2009–2010)
Sato Kilman, Prime minister (2010–2011)
Serge Vohor, Prime minister (2011)
Sato Kilman, Prime minister (2011)
Edward Natapei, Acting Prime minister (2011)
Sato Kilman, Prime minister (2011–2013)
Moana Carcasses Kalosil, Prime minister (2013–2014)
Joe Natuman, Prime minister (2014–2015)
Sato Kilman, Prime minister (2015–2016)
Charlot Salwai, Prime minister (2016–2020)
Bob Loughman, Prime minister (2020–2022)
Ishmael Kalsakau, Prime Minister (2022–present)

See also
 List of governors of dependent territories in the 21st century
 List of state leaders in the 20th century (1951–2000)  
 List of current heads of state and government 
 Lists of state leaders by year

Notes

References 

State leaders

-